= 2008 European Fencing Championships =

International fencing competition

The 2008 European Fencing Championships were held in Kyiv, Ukraine. The event took place from July 5 to July 10, 2008.

== Medal summary ==
=== Men's events ===
Event	Gold	Silver	Bronze
Foil	Andrea Cassarà (ITA)	Laurence Halsted (GBR)	Andriy Pohrebnyak (UKR); Roland Schlosser (AUT)
Épée	Géza Imre (HUN)	Martin Schmitt (GER)	Michael Kauter (SUI); Jean-Michel Lucenay (FRA)
Sabre	Aliaksandr Buikevich (BLR)	Aleksey Yakimenko (RUS)	Mihai Covaliu (ROU); Nicolas Limbach (GER)
Team Foil	Poland	Russia	France
Team Épée	France	Hungary	Italy
Team Sabre	Russia	France	Belarus

=== Women's events ===
Event	Gold	Silver	Bronze
Foil	Adeline Wuillème (FRA)	Margherita Granbassi (ITA)	Carolin Golubytskyi (GER); Małgorzata Wojtkowiak (POL)
Épée	Adrienn Hormay (HUN)	Ana Maria Brânză (ROU)	Bianca Del Carretto (ITA); Anna Sivkova (RUS)
Team sabre	Sofiya Velikaya (RUS)	Ilaria Bianco (ITA)	Réka Benkó (HUN); Yekaterina Fedorkina (RUS)
Team foil	Russia	Hungary	France
Team épée	Romania	Germany	Italy
Team sabre	Poland	Ukraine	France

== Medal table ==
* Host nation (Ukraine)

Rank	Nation	Gold	Silver	Bronze	Total
1	Russia (RUS)	3	2	2	7
2	Hungary (HUN)	2	2	1	5
3	France (FRA)	2	1	4	7
4	Poland (POL)	2	0	1	3
5	Italy (ITA)	1	2	3	6
6	Romania (ROM)	1	1	1	3
7	Belarus (BLR)	1	0	1	2
8	Germany (GER)	0	2	2	4
9	Ukraine (UKR)*	0	1	1	2
10	Great Britain (GBR)	0	1	0	1
11	Austria (AUT)	0	0	1	1
11	Switzerland (SUI)	0	0	1	1
Totals (12 entries)		12	12	18	42

== Results ==
=== Men ===
==== Épée individual ====
7 July

Position	Name	Country
1st place, gold medalist(s)	Géza Imre	Hungary
2nd place, silver medalist(s)	Martin Schmitt	Germany
3rd place, bronze medalist(s)	Michael Kauter	Switzerland
3rd place, bronze medalist(s)	Jean-Michel Lucenay	France
5.	Norman Ackermann	Germany
6.	Gábor Boczkó	Hungary
7.	Nikolai Novosjolov	Estonia
8.	Ignacio Canto	Spain

Quarter-finals
(Germany) Norman Ackermann	10
(Hungary) Géza Imre	15
(France) Jean-Michel Lucenay	15
(Spain) Ignacio Canto	11
(Germany) Martin Schmitt	15
(Hungary) Gábor Boczkó	11
(Switzerland) Michael Kauter	15
(Estonia) Nikolai Novosjolov	10

Semi-finals
(Hungary) Géza Imre	15
(France) Jean-Michel Lucenay	13
(Germany) Martin Schmitt	15
(Switzerland) Michael Kauter	14

Final
(Hungary) Géza Imre	15
(Germany) Martin Schmitt	11

==== Épée team ====
10 July

Position	Country	Name
1st place, gold medalist(s)	France	Fabrice Jeannet; Jérôme Jeannet; Jean-Michel Lucenay; Ulrich Robeiri
2nd place, silver medalist(s)	Hungary	Gábor Boczkó; Géza Imre; Iván Kovács; Krisztián Kulcsár
3rd place, bronze medalist(s)	Italy	Stefano Carozzo; Diego Confalonieri; Alfredo Rota; Matteo Tagliariol
4.	Poland	Robert Andrzejuk; Krzysztof Mikołajczak; Tomasz Motyka; Radosław Zawrotniak
5.	Ukraine	Dmytro Chumak; Dmytro Karyuchenko; Maksym Khvorost; Vitaly Medvedev
6.	Czech Republic	Jakub Ambrož; Matyas Ambroz; Jiří Beran; Zdeněk Coufal
7.	Germany	Norman Ackermann; Jörg Fiedler; Sven Schmid; Martin Schmitt
8.	Norway	Fredrik Backer; Michael Zoltan Kramarics; Bartosz Piasecki; Sturla Torkildsen

Quarter-finals
Hungary	26
Norway	21
Czech Republic	36
Poland	43
France	37
Ukraine	36
Germany	28
Italy	45

Semi-finals
Hungary	45
Poland	40
France	45
Italy	32

Final
Hungary	33
France	45
Third place
Poland	37
Italy	45

==== Foil individual ====
6 July

Position	Name	Country
1st place, gold medalist(s)	Andrea Cassarà	Italy
2nd place, silver medalist(s)	Laurence Halsted	United Kingdom
3rd place, bronze medalist(s)	Andriy Pohrebnyak	Ukraine
3rd place, bronze medalist(s)	Roland Schlosser	Austria
5.	Andrea Baldini	Italy
6.	Michał Majewski	Poland
7.	Erwann Le Péchoux	France
8.	Bogdan Gurinenko	Ukraine

Quarter-finals
(Italy) Andrea Baldini	9
(United Kingdom) Laurence Halsted	15
(Ukraine) Andriy Pohrebnyak	15
(Poland) Michał Majewski	12
(Italy) Andrea Cassarà	15
(France) Erwann Le Péchoux	11
(Austria) Roland Schlosser	15
(Ukraine) Bogdan Gurinenko	12

Semi-finals
(United Kingdom) Laurence Halsted	15
(Ukraine) Andriy Pohrebnyak	9
(Italy) Andrea Cassarà	15
(Austria) Roland Schlosser	13

Final
(United Kingdom) Laurence Halsted	9
(Italy) Andrea Cassarà	15

==== Foil team ====
9 July

Position	Country	Name
1st place, gold medalist(s)	Poland	Tomasz Ciepły; Radosław Glonek; Michał Majewski; Sławomir Mocek
2nd place, silver medalist(s)	Russia	Aleksey Cheremisinov; Igor Gridnev; Aleksey Khovanskiy; Artem Sedov
3rd place, bronze medalist(s)	France	Jérôme Jault; Térence Joubert; Gregory Koenig; Marcel Marcilloux
4.	United Kingdom	James Beevers; Laurence Halsted; James Kenber; David Riseley
5.	Spain	Luis Caplliure; Gabriel Menéndez; Javier Menéndez; Ignacio Rodriguez
6.	Hungary	Anton Berjozkin; Péter Biró; Lorenzo Mazza; Bence Széki
7.	Israel	Oren Bassal; Maor Hatoel; Tomer Or
DSQ	Italy	Andrea Baldini; Stefano Barrera; Andrea Cassarà; Salvatore Sanzo

Quarter-finals
Italy	45
Hungary	21
Spain	28
France	45
Russia	45
United Kingdom	26
Israel	34
Poland	45

Semi-finals
Italy	42
France	41
Russia	31
Poland	45

Final
Italy	45
Poland	30
Third place
France	32
Russia	45

==== Sabre individual ====
5 July

Position	Name	Country
1st place, gold medalist(s)	Aliaksandr Buikevich	Belarus
2nd place, silver medalist(s)	Aleksey Yakimenko	Russia
3rd place, bronze medalist(s)	Mihai Covaliu	Romania
3rd place, bronze medalist(s)	Nicolas Limbach	Germany
5.	Volodymyr Lukashenko	Ukraine
6.	Stanislav Pozdnyakov	Russia
7.	Luigi Tarantino	Italy
8.	Tamás Decsi	Hungary

Quarter-finals
(Italy) Luigi Tarantino	12
(Belarus) Aliaksandr Buikevich	15
(Russia) Stanislav Pozdnyakov	13
(Germany) Nicolas Limbach	15
(Ukraine) Volodymyr Lukashenko	14
(Romania) Mihai Covaliu	15
(Hungary) Tamás Decsi	12
(Russia) Aleksey Yakimenko	15

Semi-finals
(Belarus) Aliaksandr Buikevich	15
(Germany) Nicolas Limbach	8
(Romania) Mihai Covaliu	13
(Russia) Aleksey Yakimenko	15

Final
(Belarus) Aliaksandr Buikevich	15
(Russia) Aleksey Yakimenko	11

==== Sabre team ====
8 July

Position	Country	Name
1st place, gold medalist(s)	Russia	Aleksey Frosin; Nikolay Kovalev; Stanislav Pozdnyakov; Aleksey Yakimenko
2nd place, silver medalist(s)	France	Vincent Anstett; Boladé Apithy; Julien Pillet; Boris Sanson
3rd place, bronze medalist(s)	Belarus	Aliaksandr Buikevich; Dmitri Lapkes; Valery Pryiemka; Aleksei Romanovitch
4.	Romania	Mihai Covaliu; Rareș Dumitrescu; Cosmin Hănceanu; Alexandru Sirițeanu
5.	Italy	Aldo Montano; Diego Occhiuzzi; Giampiero Pastore; Luigi Tarantino
6.	Ukraine	Dmytro Boyko; Volodymyr Lukashenko; Oleh Shturbabin; Vladyslav Tretiak
7.	Hungary	Tamás Decsi; Balázs Lontay; Zsolt Nemcsik; Áron Szilágyi
8.	Germany	Benedikt Beisheim; Max Hartung; Björn Hübner; Johannes Klebes

Quarter-finals
France	45
Germany	43
Belarus	45
Italy	40
Russia	45
Ukraine	38
Romania	45
Hungary	35

Semi-finals
France	45
Belarus	42
Russia	45
Romania	44

Final
France	29
Russia	45
Third place
Belarus	45
Romania	42

=== Women ===
==== Epée individual ====
6 July

Position	Name	Country
1st place, gold medalist(s)	Adrienn Hormay	Hungary
2nd place, silver medalist(s)	Ana Maria Brânză	Romania
3rd place, bronze medalist(s)	Bianca Del Carretto	Italy
3rd place, bronze medalist(s)	Anna Sivkova	Russia
5.	Marijana Markovic	Germany
6.	Francesca Quondamcarlo	Italy
7.	Noam Mills	Israel
8.	Hajnalka Kiraly Picot	France

Quarter-finals
(Russia) Anna Sivkova	12
(Israel) Noam Mills	5
(Romania) Ana Maria Brânză	15
(Italy) Francesca Quondamcarlo	12
(Italy) Bianca Del Carretto	15
(Germany) Marijana Markovic	11
(Hungary) Adrienn Hormay	8
(France) Hajnalka Kiraly Picot	6

Semi-finals
(Russia) Anna Sivkova	11
(Romania) Ana Maria Brânză	15
(Italy) Bianca Del Carretto	6
(Hungary) Adrienn Hormay	12

Final
(Romania) Ana Maria Brânză	10
(Hungary) Adrienn Hormay	15

==== Epée team ====
9 July

Position	Country	Name
1st place, gold medalist(s)	Romania	Simona Alexandru; Ana Maria Brânză; Loredana Iordăchioiu; Iuliana Măceșeanu
2nd place, silver medalist(s)	Germany	Imke Duplitzer; Britta Heidemann; Marijana Markovic; Monika Sozanska
3rd place, bronze medalist(s)	Italy	Francesca Boscarelli; Cristiana Cascioli; Bianca Del Carretto; Francesca Quondamcarlo
4.	Hungary	Edina Antal; Katalin Izsó; Tímea Nagy; Hajnalka Tóth
5.	Poland	Danuta Dmowska-Andrzejuk; Magdalena Grabowska; Magdalena Piekarska; Małgorzata Stroka
6.	Russia	Tatiana Logunova; Elena Shasharina; Lyubov Shutova; Anna Sivkova
7.	France	Audrey Belviso; Jeanne Colignon; Sarah Daninthe; Maureen Nisima
8.	Ukraine	Olena Kryvytska; Anfisa Pochkalova; Yana Shemyakina; Eva Vybornova

Quarter-finals
France	26
Hungary	30
Romania	39
Poland	36
Germany	32
Russia	31
Ukraine	42
Italy	45

Semi-finals
Hungary	33
Romania	43
Germany	45
Italy	34

Final
Romania	45
Germany	34
Third place
Hungary	27
Italy	45

==== Foil individual ====
5 July

Position	Name	Country
1st place, gold medalist(s)	Adeline Wuillème	France
2nd place, silver medalist(s)	Margherita Granbassi	Italy
3rd place, bronze medalist(s)	Carolin Golubytskyi	Germany
3rd place, bronze medalist(s)	Małgorzata Wojtkowiak	Poland
5.	Aida Shanayeva	Russia
6.	Cristina Stahl	Romania
7.	Delila Hatuel	Israel
8.	Sylwia Gruchała	Poland

Quarter-finals
(Italy) Margherita Granbassi	12
(Poland) Sylwia Gruchała	11
(Russia) Aida Shanayeva	14
(Germany) Carolin Golubytskyi	15
(Romania) Cristina Stahl	12
(Poland) Małgorzata Wojtkowiak	15
(Israel) Delila Hatuel	2
(France) Adeline Wuillème	9

Semi-finals
(Italy) Margherita Granbassi	15
(Germany) Carolin Golubytskyi	7
(Poland) Małgorzata Wojtkowiak	7
(France) Adeline Wuillème	15

Final
(Italy) Margherita Granbassi	9
(France) Adeline Wuillème	14

==== Foil team ====
8 July

Position	Country	Name
1st place, gold medalist(s)	Russia	Svetlana Boyko; Aida Shanayeva; Olga Lobyntseva; Viktoria Nikichina
2nd place, silver medalist(s)	Hungary	Edina Knapek; Aida Mohamed; Virginie Ujlaki; Gabriella Varga
3rd place, bronze medalist(s)	France	Astrid Guyart; Corinne Maîtrejean; Mélanie Moumas; Adeline Wuillème
4.	Poland	Sylwia Gruchała; Magda Mroczkiewicz; Anna Rybicka; Małgorzata Wojtkowiak
5.	Italy	Margherita Granbassi; Ilaria Salvatori; Giovanna Trillini; Valentina Vezzali
6.	Germany	Carolin Golubytskyi; Anja Schache; Katja Waechter; Melanie Wolgast
7.	Romania	Roxana Scarlat-Bârlădeanu; Cristina Ghiță; Cristina Stahl; Daniela Tănase
8.	Ukraine	Ekateryna Karmanova; Olga Leleyko; Tetyana Savchenko; Nadiya Voychenko

Quarter-finals
Russia	40
Ukraine	28
France	34
Italy	33
Hungary	21
Germany	20
Romania	19
Poland	24

Semi-finals
Russia	45
France	16
Hungary	42
Poland	34

Final
Russia	31
Hungary	30
Third place
France	33
Poland	25

==== Sabre individual ====
7 July

Position	Name	Country
1st place, gold medalist(s)	Sofiya Velikaya	Russia
2nd place, silver medalist(s)	Ilaria Bianco	Italy
3rd place, bronze medalist(s)	Réka Benkó	Hungary
3rd place, bronze medalist(s)	Yekaterina Fedorkina	Russia
5.	Gioia Marzocca	Italy
6.	Olena Khomrova	Ukraine
7.	Anne-Lise Touya	France
8.	Halyna Pundyk	Ukraine

Quarter-finals
(France) Anne-Lise Touya	14
(Italy) Ilaria Bianco	15
(Russia) Yekaterina Fedorkina	15
(Ukraine) Halyna Pundyk	9
(Russia) Sofiya Velikaya	15
(Ukraine) Olena Khomrova	14
(Hungary) Réka Benkó	15
(Italy) Gioia Marzocca	9

Semi-finals
(Italy) Ilaria Bianco	15
(Russia) Yekaterina Fedorkina	13
(Russia) Sofiya Velikaya	15
(Hungary) Réka Benkó	5

Final
(Italy) Ilaria Bianco	10
(Russia) Sofiya Velikaya	15

==== Sabre team ====
10 July

Position	Country	Name
1st place, gold medalist(s)	Poland	Bogna Jóźwiak; Matylda Ostojska; Aleksandra Socha; Irena Wieckowska
2nd place, silver medalist(s)	Ukraine	Olha Kharlan; Olena Khomrova; Nina Kozlova; Halyna Pundyk
3rd place, bronze medalist(s)	France	Cécilia Berder; Solenne Mary; Anne-Lise Touya; Carole Vergne
4.	Hungary	Réka Benkó; Réka Pető; Gabriella Sznopek; Kata Várhelyi
5.	Russia	Yekaterina Dyachenko; Ekaterina Fedorkina; Yelena Nechayeva; Sofiya Velikaya
6.	Italy	Ilaria Bianco; Loreta Gulotta; Gioia Marzocca; Irene Vecchi
7.	United Kingdom	Louise Bond-Williams; Katie Hendra; Joanna Hutchison; Chrystall Nicoll
8.	Germany	Doreen Häntzsch; Stefanie Kubissa; Anna Limbach; Margrita Tschomakov

Quarter-finals
France	45
Germany	22
Poland	45
Italy	38
Ukraine	45
United Kingdom	29
Hungary	45
Russia	44

Semi-finals
France	43
Poland	45
Ukraine	45
Hungary	34

Final
Poland	45
Ukraine	44
Third place
France	45
Hungary	35
