= 2009 European Fencing Championships =

International fencing competition

The 2009 European Fencing Championships was held at the International Fair Plovdiv in Plovdiv, Bulgaria. The event took place from July 14 to July 19, 2009.

== Schedule ==
●	Opening Ceremony	●	Finals	●	Closing Ceremony

July	13	14	15	16	17	18	19	Total
Ceremonies	●						●	
Épée Individual			Women	Men				2
Épée team						Women	Men	2
Foil Individual		Women	Men					2
Foil Team					Women	Men		2
Sabre Individual		Men		Women				2
Sabre Team					Men		Women	2
Total Gold Medals		2	2	2	2	2	2	12

== Medal summary ==
=== Men's events ===
Event	Gold	Silver	Bronze
Épée	Sven Schmid (GER)	Ulrich Robeiri (FRA)	Gábor Boczkó (HUN); Gauthier Grumier (FRA)
Foil	Andrea Baldini (ITA)	Richard Kruse (GBR)	Andre Wessels (GER); Laurence Halsted (GBR)
Sabre	Veniamin Reshetnikov (RUS)	Julien Pillet (FRA)	Giampiero Pastore (ITA); Björn Hübner (GER)
Team Épée	Hungary	Switzerland	Italy
Team Foil	Italy	Russia	Germany
Team Sabre	Italy	Romania	France

=== Women's events ===
Event	Gold	Silver	Bronze
Épée	Britta Heidemann (GER)	Anna Sivkova (RUS)	Laura Flessel-Colovic (FRA); Yana Shemyakina (UKR)
Foil	Valentina Vezzali (ITA)	Katja Wächter (GER)	Gabriella Varga (HUN); Arianna Errigo (ITA)
Sabre	Olha Kharlan (UKR)	Yekaterina Dyachenko (RUS)	Solenne Mary (FRA); Halyna Pundyk (UKR)
Team Épée	Romania	Poland	Switzerland
Team Foil	Italy	Russia	France
Team Sabre	Ukraine	Russia	Italy

== Medal table ==
Rank	Nation	Gold	Silver	Bronze	Total
1	Italy (ITA)	5	0	4	9
2	Germany (GER)	2	1	3	6
3	Ukraine (UKR)	2	0	2	4
4	Russia (RUS)	1	5	0	6
5	Romania (ROU)	1	1	0	2
6	Hungary (HUN)	1	0	2	3
7	France (FRA)	0	2	5	7
8	Great Britain (GBR)	0	1	1	2
8	Switzerland (SUI)	0	1	1	2
10	Poland (POL)	0	1	0	1
Totals (10 entries)		12	12	18	42

== Results overview ==
=== Men ===
==== Foil individual ====
Position	Name	Country
1st place, gold medalist(s)	Andrea Baldini	Italy
2nd place, silver medalist(s)	Richard Kruse	United Kingdom
3rd place, bronze medalist(s)	Andre Wessels	Germany
3rd place, bronze medalist(s)	Laurence Halsted	United Kingdom
5.	Stefano Barrera	Italy
6.	Radosław Glonek	Poland
7.	Peter Joppich	Germany
8.	Aleksey Khovanskiy	Russia

Quarter-finals
(United Kingdom) Richard Kruse	15
(Poland) Radosław Glonek	14
(Russia) Aleksey Khovanskiy	12
(United Kingdom) Laurence Halsted	13
(Italy) Stefano Barrera	12
(Germany) Andre Wessels	15
(Germany) Peter Joppich	14
(Italy) Andrea Baldini	15

Semi-finals
(United Kingdom) Richard Kruse	15
(United Kingdom) Laurence Halsted	12
(Germany) Andre Wessels	7
(Italy) Andrea Baldini	15

Final
(United Kingdom) Richard Kruse	7
(Italy) Andrea Baldini	15

==== Foil team ====
Position	Name	Country
1st place, gold medalist(s)	Stefano Barrera; Andrea Cassarà; Simone Vanni; Andrea Baldini	Italy
2nd place, silver medalist(s)	Renal Ganeyev; Artem Sedov; Aleksey Khovanskiy; Aleksandr Stukalin	Russia
3rd place, bronze medalist(s)	Dominik Behr; Peter Joppich; Benjamin Kleibrink; Sebastian Bachmann	Germany
4	James Kenber; Laurence Halsted; Richard Kruse; Edward Jefferies	United Kingdom
5.	Gregory Koenig; Erwann Le Péchoux; Brice Guyart; Térence Joubert	France
6.	Sławomir Mocek; Radosław Glonek; Marcin Zawada; Pawel Osmanski	Poland
7.	Moritz Hinterseer; Renee Pranz; Roland Schlosser; Tobias Hinterseer	Austria
8.	Gabriel Menendez; Javier Menendez; Luis Caplliure; Ignacio Rodriguez	Spain

Quarter-finals
Italy	45
Austria	42
Germany	45
France	40
Poland	42
United Kingdom	45
Spain	27
Russia	40

Semi-finals
Italy	45
Germany	44
United Kingdom	37
Russia	45

Final
Italy	44
Russia	43
Third place
Germany	45
United Kingdom	31

==== Epée individual ====
Position	Name	Country
1st place, gold medalist(s)	Sven Schmid	Germany
2nd place, silver medalist(s)	Ulrich Robeiri	France
3rd place, bronze medalist(s)	Gábor Boczkó	Hungary
3rd place, bronze medalist(s)	Gauthier Grumier	France
5.	Jörg Fiedler	Germany
6.	Bohdan Nikishyn	Ukraine
7.	Jérôme Jeannet	France
8.	José Luis Abajo	Spain

Quarter-finals
(Germany) Jörg Fiedler	9
(France) Ulrich Robeiri	15
(Spain) José Luis Abajo	10
(Hungary) Gábor Boczkó	15
(Ukraine) Bohdan Nikishyn	7
(Germany) Sven Schmid	8
(France) Gauthier Grumier	15
(France) Jérôme Jeannet	7

Semi-finals
(France) Ulrich Robeiri	15
(Hungary) Gábor Boczkó	12
(Germany) Sven Schmid	15
(France) Gauthier Grumier	14

Final
(France) Ulrich Robeiri	7
(Germany) Sven Schmid	15

==== Epée team ====
Position	Name	Country
1st place, gold medalist(s)	Gábor Boczkó; Géza Imre; András Rédli	Hungary
2nd place, silver medalist(s)	Fabian Kauter; Max Heinzer; Benjamin Steffen	Switzerland
3rd place, bronze medalist(s)	Alfredo Rota; Matteo Tagliariol; Diego Confalonieri; Francesco Martinelli	Italy
4.	Tomasz Motyka; Radosław Zawrotniak; Krzysztof Mikołajczak	Poland
5.	Gauthier Grumier; Jérôme Jeannet; Jean-Michel Lucenay; Ulrich Robeiri	France
6.	Maksym Khvorost; Bohdan Nikishyn; Igor Reyzlin; Vitaly Medvedev	Ukraine
7.	Aleksey Tikhomirov; Igor Turchin; Anton Avdeev; Alexander Berezkin	Russia
8.	Fredrik Backer; Alexandr Tarkovskij Hemmi; Sturla Torkildsen; Bartosz Piasecki	Norway

Quarter-finals
France	32
Switzerland	45
Norway	36
Poland	43
Hungary	45
Ukraine	35
Russia	20
Italy	21

Semi-finals
Switzerland	42
Poland	36
Hungary	30
Italy	29

Final
Switzerland	32
Hungary	45
Third place
Poland	39
Italy	45

==== Sabre individual ====
Position	Name	Country
1st place, gold medalist(s)	Veniamin Reshetnikov	Russia
2nd place, silver medalist(s)	Julien Pillet	France
3rd place, bronze medalist(s)	Giampiero Pastore	Italy
3rd place, bronze medalist(s)	Björn Hübner	Germany
5.	Nicolas Limbach	Germany
6.	Jorge Pina	Spain
7.	Dmitri Lapkes	Belarus
8.	Nikolay Kovalev	Russia

Quarter-finals
(Russia) Veniamin Reshetnikov	15
(Belarus) Dmitri Lapkes	10
(Italy) Giampiero Pastore	15
(Germany) Nicolas Limbach	14
(Germany) Björn Hübner	15
(Spain) Jorge Pina	10
(France) Julien Pillet	15
(Russia) Nikolay Kovalev	6

Semi-finals
(Russia) Veniamin Reshetnikov	15
(Italy) Giampiero Pastore	6
(Germany) Björn Hübner	13
(France) Julien Pillet	15

Final
(Russia) Veniamin Reshetnikov	15
(France) Julien Pillet	14

==== Sabre team ====
Position	Name	Country
1st place, gold medalist(s)	Giampiero Pastore; Aldo Montano; Luigi Tarantino; Diego Occhiuzzi	Italy
2nd place, silver medalist(s)	Florin Zalomir; Cosmin Hănceanu; Rareș Dumitrescu; Alexandru Sirițeanu	Romania
3rd place, bronze medalist(s)	Nicolas Lopez; Julien Pillet; Boladé Apithy; Vincent Anstett	France
4.	Áron Szilágyi; Tamás Decsi; Balázs Lontay; Nikolász Iliász	Hungary
5.	Aliaksandr Buikevich; Valery Pryiemka; Dmitri Lapkes	Belarus
6.	Nikolay Kovalev; Veniamin Reshetnikov; Ilia Mokretsov; Nikita Proskura	Russia
7.	Nicolas Limbach; Björn Hübner; Johannes Klebes; Benedikt Beisheim	Germany
8.	Jorge Pina; Jaime Martí; Fernando Casares; Pablo Moreno	Spain

Quarter-finals
France	45
Germany	37
Romania	45
Belarus	40
Hungary	45
Russia	40
Spain	32
Italy	45

Semi-finals
France	25
Romania	45
Hungary	31
Italy	45

Final
Romania	39
Italy	45
Third place
France	45
Hungary	40

=== Women ===
==== Sabre individual ====
Position	Name	Country
1st place, gold medalist(s)	Olha Kharlan	Ukraine
2nd place, silver medalist(s)	Yekaterina Dyachenko	Russia
3rd place, bronze medalist(s)	Solenne Mary	France
3rd place, bronze medalist(s)	Halyna Pundyk	Ukraine
5.	Vasiliki Vougiouka	Greece
6.	Irena Więckowska	Poland
7.	Andreea Pelei	Romania
8.	Katarzyna Kedziora	Poland

Quarter-finals
(Poland) Irena Więckowska	12
(France) Solenne Mary	15
(Greece) Vasiliki Vougiouka	3
(Russia) Ekaterina Diatchenko	15
(Ukraine) Olha Kharlan	15
(Poland) Katarzyna Kedziora	9
(Ukraine) Halyna Pundyk	15
(Romania) Andreea Pelei	11

Semi-finals
(France) Solenne Mary	11
(Russia) Yekaterina Dyachenko	15
(Ukraine) Olha Kharlan	15
(Ukraine) Halyna Pundyk	7

Final
(Russia) Yekaterina Dyachenko	10
(Ukraine) Olha Kharlan	15

==== Sabre team ====
Position	Name	Country
1st place, gold medalist(s)	Halyna Pundyk; Olha Kharlan; Olena Khomrova	Ukraine
2nd place, silver medalist(s)	Yekaterina Dyachenko; Yuliya Gavrilova; Sofiya Velikaya	Russia
3rd place, bronze medalist(s)	Irene Vecchi; Gioia Marzocca; Ilaria Bianco	Italy
4.	Orsolya Nagy; Réka Benkó; Réka Pető; Anna Várhelyi	Hungary
5.	Carole Vergne; Léonore Perrus; Solenne Mary; Cécilia Berder	France
6.	Aleksandra Socha; Matylda Ostojska; Irena Więckowska; Katarzyna Kedziora	Poland
7.	Sibylle Klemm; Stefanie Kubissa; Anna Limbach; Margarita Tschomakov	Germany
8.	Mihaela Bulică; Andreea Pelei; Elena Munteanu; Bianca Pascu	Romania

Quarter-finals
Ukraine	45
Romania	22
Hungary	45
France	43
Poland	38
Italy	45
Germany	36
Russia	45

Semi-finals
Ukraine	45
Hungary	36
Italy	29
Russia	45

Final
Ukraine	45
Russia	31
Third place
Hungary	40
Italy	45

==== Foil individual ====
Position	Name	Country
1st place, gold medalist(s)	Valentina Vezzali	Italy
2nd place, silver medalist(s)	Katja Wächter	Germany
3rd place, bronze medalist(s)	Gabriella Varga	Hungary
3rd place, bronze medalist(s)	Arianna Errigo	Italy
5.	Aida Shanayeva	Russia
6.	Corinne Maîtrejean	France
7.	Carolin Golubytskyi	Germany
8.	Cristina Stahl	Romania

Quarter-finals
(Italy) Valentina Vezzali	15
(Romania) Cristina Stahl	7
(Hungary) Gabriella Varga	15
(France) Corinne Maîtrejean	9
(Russia) Aida Shanayeva	9
(Germany) Katja Wächter	10
(Germany) Carolin Golubytskyi	9
(Italy) Arianna Errigo	15

Semi-finals
(Italy) Valentina Vezzali	15
(Hungary) Gabriella Varga	13
(Germany) Katja Wächter	15
(Italy) Arianna Errigo	13

Final
(Italy) Valentina Vezzali	15
(Germany) Katja Wächter	8

==== Foil team ====
Position	Name	Country
1st place, gold medalist(s)	Elisa Di Francisca; Arianna Errigo; Ilaria Salvatori; Valentina Vezzali	Italy
2nd place, silver medalist(s)	Aida Shanayeva; Yuliya Biryukova; Olga Lobyntseva; Kamilla Gafurzianova	Russia
3rd place, bronze medalist(s)	Virginie Ujlaky; Astrid Guyart; Corinne Maîtrejean; Mélanie Moumas	France
4.	Sylwia Gruchała; Anna Rybicka; Malgorzata Wojtkowiak; Martyna Synoradzka	Poland
5.	Carolin Golubytsky; Katja Wächter; Anja Schache; Maria Bartkowski	Germany
6.	Olena Khismatulina; Olga Leleyko; Kateryna Chentsova; Anastasiya Moskovska	Ukraine
7.	Cristina Stahl; Cristina Ghiță; Maria Udrea; Corina Indrei	Romania
8.	Gabriella Varga; Fanny Kreiss; Katalin Varga; Adrienn Berta	Hungary

Quarter-finals
Russia	40
Ukraine	25
Hungary	33
Poland	45
Germany	25
France	33
Romania	31
Italy	40

Semi-finals
Russia	45
Poland	41
France	30
Italy	45

Final
Russia	36
Italy	45
Third place
Poland	25
France	45

==== Epée individual ====
Position	Name	Country
1st place, gold medalist(s)	Britta Heidemann	Germany
2nd place, silver medalist(s)	Anna Sivkova	Russia
3rd place, bronze medalist(s)	Laura Flessel-Colovic	France
3rd place, bronze medalist(s)	Yana Shemyakina	Ukraine
5.	Emese Szász	Hungary
6.	Tatiana Logounova	Russia
7.	Noam Mills	Israel
8.	Irina Embrich	Estonia

Quarter-finals
(Ukraine) Yana Shemyakina	15
(Israel) Noam Mills	13
(Germany) Britta Heidemann	14
(Estonia) Irina Embrich	13
(Hungary) Emese Szász	8
(Russia) Anna Sivkova	9
(Russia) Tatiana Logounova	8
(France) Laura Flessel-Colovic	9

Semi-finals
(Ukraine) Yana Shemyakina	14
(Germany) Britta Heidemann	15
(Russia) Anna Sivkova	9
(France) Laura Flessel-Colovic	7

Final
(Germany) Britta Heidemann	15
(Russia) Anna Sivkova	8

==== Épée team ====
Position	Name	Country
1st place, gold medalist(s)	Ana Maria Brânză; Anca Măroiu; Iuliana Măceșeanu; Simona Alexandru	Romania
2nd place, silver medalist(s)	Małgorzata Bereza; Magdalena Piekarska; Danuta Dmowska	Poland
3rd place, bronze medalist(s)	Sophie Lamon; Simone Naef; Tiffany Géroudet	Switzerland
4.	Monika Sozanska; Britta Heidemann; Marijana Marković; Imke Duplitzer	Germany
5.	Emese Szász; Emese Takács; Katalin Izsó	Hungary
6.	Hajnalka Kiraly Picot; Laura Flessel-Colovic; Jeanne Colignon; Vanessa Galantine	France
7.	Bianca Del Carretto; Nathalie Moellhausen; Cristiana Cascioli; Francesca Quondamcarlo	Italy
8.	Tatiana Logunova; Anna Sivkova; Lyubov Shutova; Yekaterina Tikhonenkova	Russia

Quarter-finals
France	42
Switzerland	43
Italy	31
Poland	40
Romania	45
Russia	31
Hungary	23
Germany	24

Semi-finals
Switzerland	38
Poland	45
Romania	43
Germany	38

Final
Poland	34
Romania	36
Third place
Switzerland	43
Germany	41
