= 2005–06 Fencing World Cup =

International fencing competition

The 35th FIE Fencing World Cup began in October 2005 and concluded in September 2006 at the 2006 World Fencing Championships in Turino, Italy.

== Individual Épée ==
Men
1	Gábor Boczkó (HUN)	224
2	Dmytro Karyuchenko (UKR)	188
3	Érik Boisse (FRA)	174
4	Ulrich Robeiri (FRA)	148
5	Fabrice Jeannet (FRA)	148
6	Jörg Fiedler (GER)	144
7	Diego Confalonieri (ITA)	142
8	Wang Lei (CHN)	126
9	Paolo Milanoli (ITA)	118
10	Benjamin Steffen (SUI)	116

Women
1	Sherraine Schalm (CAN)	256
2	Imke Duplitzer (GER)	246
3	Laura Flessel-Colovic (FRA)	228
4	Emese Szász (HUN)	190
5	Tímea Nagy (HUN)	168
6	Anna Sivkova (RUS)	160
7	Ana Maria Brânză (ROU)	158
8	Adrienn Hormay (HUN)	156
9	Oksana Yermakova (RUS)	152
10	Li Na (CHN)	146

== Individual Foil ==
Men
1	Andrea Cassarà (ITA)	326
2	Peter Joppich (GER)	296
3	Andrea Baldini (ITA)	282
4	Benjamin Kleibrink (GER)	224
5	Lei Sheng (CHN)	182
6	Salvatore Sanzo (ITA)	170
7	Stefano Barrera (ITA)	160
8	Zhang Liangliang (CHN)	158
9	Sławomir Mocek (POL)	150
10	Loïc Attely (FRA)	150

Women
1	Valentina Vezzali (ITA)	274
2	Nam Hyun-hee (KOR)	242
3	Sylwia Gruchała (POL)	240
4	Anja Schache (GER)	230
5	Ianna Rouzavina (RUS)	224
6	Giovanna Trillini (ITA)	208
7	Margherita Granbassi (ITA)	206
8	Edina Knapek (HUN)	174
9	Elisa Di Francisca (ITA)	168
10	Aida Mohamed (HUN)	130

== Individual Sabre ==
Men
1	Zsolt Nemcsik (HUN)	334
2	Dmitry Lapkes (BLR)	256
3	Julien Pillet (FRA)	226
4	Aleksey Yakimenko (RUS)	186
5	Nicolas Limbach (GER)	174
6	Boris Sanson (FRA)	174
7	Jorge Pina (ESP)	164
8	Mihai Covaliu (ROU)	164
9	Dennis Bauer (GER)	162
10	Stanislav Pozdnyakov (RUS)	160

Women
1	Mariel Zagunis (USA)	276
2	Rebecca Ward (USA)	216
3	Sofiya Velikaya (RUS)	210
4	Léonore Perrus (FRA)	204
5	Anne-Lise Touya (FRA)	188
6	Sada Jacobson (USA)	182
7	Ekaterina Fedorkina (RUS)	180
8	Bogna Jóźwiak (POL)	174
9	Yekaterina Dyachenko (RUS)	144
10	Tan Xue (CHN)	130

== Team Épée ==
Men
1	France	336
2	Ukraine	256
3	Spain	238
4	Hungary	237
5	Italy	214
6	Poland	185
7	Germany	184
8	Russia	183
9	Switzerland	171
10	Sweden	132

Women
1	France	312
2	China	356
3	Germany	252
4	Hungary	217
5	Ukraine	196
6	Russia	195
7	South Korea	184
8	Poland	164
9	Italy	159
10	Japan	147

== Team Foil ==
Men
1	France	372
2	Germany	300
3	Italy	288
4	Russia	208
5	Poland	188
6	Japan	171
7	Poland	166
8	United States	162
9	Great Britain	156
10	Austria	155

Women
1	Russia	336
2	Poland	260
3	France	260
4	Italy	244
5	Hungary	220
6	South Korea	190
7	Germany	188
8	Japan	182
9	Romania	169
10	China	164

== Team Sabre ==
Men
1	France	336
2	Ukraine	308
3	Hungary	248
4	Russia	235
5	Germany	218
6	Italy	208
7	Poland	194
8	South Korea	191
9	Romania	176
10	Spain	171

Women
1	Russia	292
2	United States	284
3	France	258
4	Poland	218
5	China	188
6	Ukraine	184
7	Hungary	179
8	Germany	167
9	Japan	148
10	South Korea	142
