= Fencing at the 2008 Summer Olympics – Men's foil =

Men's foil at the Games of the XXIX Olympiad
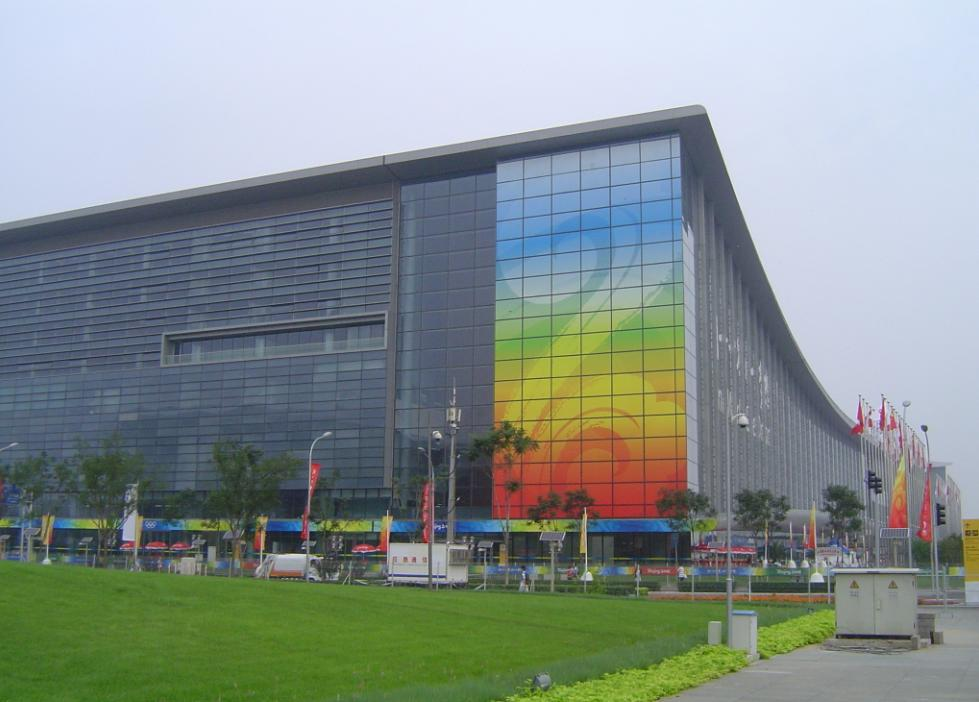
- Fencing Hall at the Olympic Green Convention Centre
- Venue: Olympic Green Convention Centre
- Date: 13 August 2008
- Competitors: 26 from 21 nations

Medalists
| 1st place, gold medalist(s) | | Benjamin Kleibrink | Germany |
| 2nd place, silver medalist(s) | | Yuki Ota | Japan |
| 3rd place, bronze medalist(s) | | Salvatore Sanzo | Italy |

The men's foil fencing competition at the 2008 Summer Olympics in Beijing took place on August 13 at the Olympic Green Convention Centre. There were 26 competitors from 21 nations. The event was won by Benjamin Kleibrink of Germany, the nation's first victory in the men's foil. Yuki Ota's silver was Japan's first medal in the event. Salvatore Sanzo of Italy took bronze, becoming the 10th man to win multiple medals in the event.

== Background ==
This was the 25th appearance of the event, which has been held at every Summer Olympics except 1908 (when there was a foil display only rather than a medal event). Two of the eight quarterfinalists from 2004 returned: gold medalist Brice Guyart of France, silver medalist (and 2000 quarterfinalist) Salvatore Sanzo of Italy, bronze medalist Andrea Cassarà of Italy, sixth-place finisher Peter Joppich of Germany, and eighth-place finisher Richard Kruse of Great Britain. Sanzo had won the 2001 and 2005 World Championships; Joppich had won in 2003, 2006, and 2007. The runner-up in Joppich's latest two titles, Andrea Baldini of Italy, had tested positive for a banned diuretic and could not compete (though he was later cleared and competed in 2012). This made Joppich a heavy favorite.

Qatar and Thailand each made their debut in the men's foil. France and the United States each made their 23rd appearance, tied for most of any nation; France had missed only the 1904 (with fencers not traveling to St. Louis) and the 1912 (boycotted due to a dispute over rules) foil competitions, while the United States had missed the inaugural 1896 competition and boycotted the 1980 Games altogether.

== Qualification ==
Nations had been limited to three fencers each since 1928. However, the 2008 Games introduced a rotation of men's team fencing events with one weapon left off each Games; the individual event without a corresponding team event had the number of fencers per nation reduced to two. Men's foil was the first event this applied to, so each nation could enter a maximum of two fencers in the event in 2008.

There were 24 dedicated quota spots for men's foil. The first 8 men in the FIE Individual Ranking (applying the two-per-nation limit) received spots. Next, 8 more men were selected from the ranking based on continents: 3 from Europe, 2 from the Americas, 2 from Asia/Oceania, and 1 from Africa; each nation could only earn one spot from this continental ranking, but it could be added to a spot from the world ranking to bring the nation up to two total. Finally, eight spots were allocated by continental qualifying events with the same split as the ranking. Nations could only earn one spot from these events and only if they had no fencer qualified through rankings.

Additionally, there were 8 host/invitational spots that could be spread throughout the various fencing events. China used only 2 of those places to max out its representation in all events, so 6 spots were assigned by Tripartite Commission invitation. Two were used in the men's foil (for Khalid Al-Hamadi of Qatar and Richard Kruse of Great Britain).

== Competition format ==
The foil competition consisted of a five-round single-elimination bracket with a bronze medal match between the two semifinal losers. Fencing was done to 15 touches or to the completion of three three-minute rounds if neither fencer reached 15 touches by then. At the end of time, the higher-scoring fencer was the winner; a tie resulted in an additional one-minute sudden-death time period. This sudden-death period was further modified by the selection of a draw-winner beforehand; if neither fencer scored a touch during the minute, the predetermined draw-winner won the bout.

== Schedule ==
All times are China Standard Time (UTC+8)

| Date | Time | Round |
|---|---|---|
| Wednesday, 13 August 2008 | | Round of 32; Round of 16; Quarterfinals; Semifinals; Bronze medal match Final |

== Results ==
=== Section 1 ===
Round of 32
17 | Roland Schlosser (AUT) | 15
16 | Javier Menendez (ESP) | 9
9 | Gerek Meinhardt (USA) | 15
24 | Mostafa Nagaty (EGY) | 3
25 | Alberto Viaggio (ARG) | 2
8 | Zhu Jun (CHN) | 15
21 | Lau Kwok Kin (HKG) | 6
12 | Kenta Chida (JPN) | 15
13 | Sławomir Mocek (POL) | 15
20 | Nontapat Panchan (THA) | 7

Round of 16
1 | Andrea Cassarà (ITA) | 15
17 | Roland Schlosser (AUT) | 8
9 | Gerek Meinhardt (USA) | 9
8 | Zhu Jun (CHN) | 15
5 | Benjamin Kleibrink (GER) | 15
12 | Kenta Chida (JPN) | 10
13 | Sławomir Mocek (POL) | 8
4 | Lei Sheng (CHN) | 15

Quarterfinals
1 | Andrea Cassarà (ITA) | 14
8 | Zhu Jun (CHN) | 15
5 | Benjamin Kleibrink (GER) | 15
4 | Lei Sheng (CHN) | 7

Semifinals
8 | Zhu Jun (CHN) | 4
5 | Benjamin Kleibrink (GER) | 15

=== Section 2 ===
Round of 32
19 | Ali Xavier Lahoussine (MAR) | 3
14 | Brice Guyart (FRA) | 15
11 | Tomer Or (ISR) | 10
22 | Josh McGuire (CAN) | 11
7 | Choi Byung-chul (KOR) | 15
26 | Khalid Al-Hamadi (QAT) | 3
23 | João Souza (BRA) | 4
10 | Yuki Ota (JPN) | 15
15 | Richard Kruse (GBR) | 15
18 | Virgil Sălișcan (ROU) | 6

Round of 16
3 | Erwann Le Péchoux (FRA) | 15
14 | Brice Guyart (FRA) | 10
22 | Josh McGuire (CAN) | 3
6 | Salvatore Sanzo (ITA) | 15
7 | Choi Byung-chul (KOR) | 14
10 | Yuki Ota (JPN) | 15
15 | Richard Kruse (GBR) | 9
2 | Peter Joppich (GER) | 10

Quarterfinals
3 | Erwann Le Péchoux (FRA) | 9
6 | Salvatore Sanzo (ITA) | 10
10 | Yuki Ota (JPN) | 15
2 | Peter Joppich (GER) | 12

Semifinals
6 | Salvatore Sanzo (ITA) | 14
10 | Yuki Ota (JPN) | 15

=== Finals ===
Semifinals
Zhu Jun (CHN) | 4
Benjamin Kleibrink (GER) | 15
Salvatore Sanzo (ITA) | 14
Yuki Ota (JPN) | 15

Final
Benjamin Kleibrink (GER) | 15
Yuki Ota (JPN) | 9
Bronze medal match
Zhu Jun (CHN) | 14
Salvatore Sanzo (ITA) | 15

== Final classification ==
| Rank | Fencer | Nation |
|---|---|---|
| 1st place, gold medalist(s) | Benjamin Kleibrink | Germany |
| 2nd place, silver medalist(s) | Yuki Ota | Japan |
| 3rd place, bronze medalist(s) | Salvatore Sanzo | Italy |
| 4 | Jun Zhu | China |
| 5 | Peter Joppich | Germany |
| 6 | Andrea Cassarà | Italy |
| 7 | Erwann Le Péchoux | France |
| 8 | Sheng Lei | China |
| 9 | Byung-chul Choi | South Korea |
| 10 | Gerek Meinhardt | United States |
| 11 | Kenta Chida | Japan |
| 12 | Sławomir Mocek | Poland |
| 13 | Brice Guyart | France |
| 14 | Richard Kruse | Great Britain |
| 15 | Roland Schlosser | Austria |
| 16 | Josh McGuire | Canada |
| 17 | Tomer Or | Israel |
| 18 | Javier Menéndez | Spain |
| 19 | Virgil Saliscan | Romania |
| 20 | Ali Xavier Lahoussine | Morocco |
| 21 | Nontapat Panchan | Thailand |
| 22 | Kwok Kin Lau | Hong Kong |
| 23 | João Souza | Brazil |
| 24 | Mostafa Nagaty | Egypt |
| 25 | Khalid Al-Hamadi | Qatar |
| 26 | Alberto Viaggio | Argentina |
