= 2007–08 Fencing World Cup =

International fencing competition

The 37th FIE Fencing World Cup began in October 2007 and concluded in August 2008 at the 2008 Summer Olympics in Beijing.

== Individual Épée ==
Men
1	Matteo Tagliariol (ITA)	290
2	Jung Jin-sun (KOR)	230
3	Silvio Fernández (VEN)	220
4	Michael Kauter (SUI)	192
5	Radosław Zawrotniak (POL)	192
6	Jérôme Jeannet (FRA)	186
7	Gábor Boczkó (HUN)	186
8	Bas Verwijlen (NED)	182
9	Géza Imre (HUN)	180
10	Seth Kelsey (USA)	180

Women
1	Ana Maria Brânză (ROU)	324
2	Britta Heidemann (GER)	286
3	Imke Duplitzer (GER)	258
4	Sherraine Schalm (CAN)	238
5	Li Na (CHN)	212
6	Ildikó Mincza-Nébald (HUN)	204
7	Hajnalka Kiraly (FRA)	190
8	Zhong Weiping (CHN)	182
9	Lyubov Shutova (RUS)	180
10	Emese Szász (HUN)	178

== Individual Foil ==
Men
1	Andrea Cassarà (ITA)	304
2	Erwann Le Péchoux (FRA)	260
3	Peter Joppich (GER)	260
4	Benjamin Kleibrink (GER)	256
5	Andrea Baldini (ITA)	236
6	Zhu Jun (CHN)	226
7	Yuki Ota (JPN)	224
8	Salvatore Sanzo (ITA)	224
9	Choi Byung-chul (KOR)	214
10	Lei Sheng (CHN)	204

Women
1	Valentina Vezzali (ITA)	376
2	Nam Hyun-hee (KOR)	286
3	Giovanna Trillini (ITA)	266
4	Carolin Golubytskyi (GER)	240
5	Margherita Granbassi (ITA)	238
6	Adeline Wuillème (FRA)	216
7	Corinne Maîtrejean (FRA)	194
8	Chieko Sugawara (JPN)	172
9	Emily Cross (USA)	164
10	Yevgeniya Lamonova (RUS)	164

== Individual Sabre ==
Men
1	Luigi Tarantino (ITA)	330
2	Zhong Man (CHN)	284
3	Nicolas Limbach (GER)	276
4	Rareș Dumitrescu (ROU)	246
5	Keeth Smart (USA)	244
6	Mihai Covaliu (ROU)	242
7	Aldo Montano (ITA)	212
8	Jaime Martí (ESP)	204
9	Zsolt Nemcsik (HUN)	200
10	Tamás Decsi (HUN)	200

Women
1	Rebecca Ward (USA)	376
2	Sada Jacobson (USA)	366
3	Mariel Zagunis (USA)	292
4	Tan Xue (CHN)	278
5	Sofiya Velikaya (RUS)	232
6	Bao Yingying (CHN)	198
7	Yekaterina Dyachenko (RUS)	194
8	Lee Shin-mi (KOR)	190
9	Léonore Perrus (FRA)	188
10	Aleksandra Socha (POL)	184

== Team Épée ==
Men
1	France	345
2	Hungary	336
3	Italy	316
4	Poland	308
5	South Korea	241
6	Ukraine	232
7	China	210
8	Venezuela	208
9	Germany	167
10	Russia	157

Women
1	China	364
2	France	306
3	Germany	300
4	Italy	282
5	Romania	274
6	Poland	262
7	Russia	246
8	Japan	192
9	Hungary	188
10	Ukraine	164

== Team Foil ==
Men
1	Italy	326
2	Poland	322
3	China	290
4	Russia	280
5	Japan	256
6	Germany	254
7	France	211
8	United Kingdom	194
9	United States	192
10	Canada	163

Women
1	Russia	412
2	Italy	304
3	Hungary	292
4	Poland	280
5	United States	272
6	China	242
7	Germany	232
8	France	196
9	Japan	158
10	Egypt	124

== Team Sabre ==
Men
1	France	384
2	Russia	320
3	Italy	294
4	Belarus	280
5	United States	273
6	China	263
7	Hungary	252
8	Romania	184
9	South Korea	163
10	Ukraine	152

Women
1	United States	400
2	China	334
3	Ukraine	306
4	France	284
5	Russia	276
6	Poland	258
7	South Korea	196
8	Canada	193
9	Italy	160
10	Japan	129
