= Michał Majewski =

Polish fencer

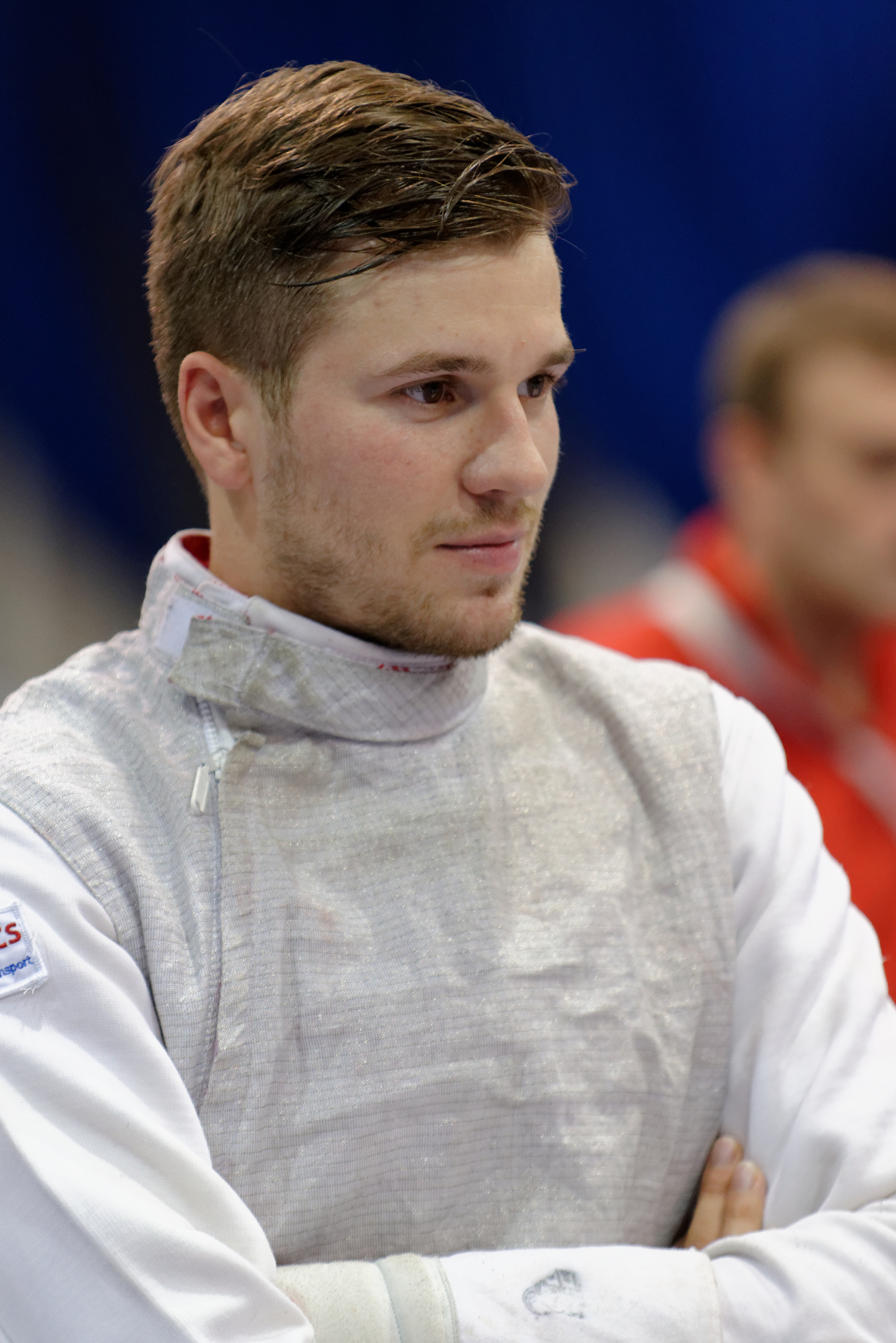
- Majewski at the 2013 World Fencing Championships

Personal information
- Born: 23 February 1987 (age 39)
- Height: 1.84 m (6 ft 1/2 in)
- Weight: 73 kg (161 lb; 11.5 st)

Fencing career
- Sport: Fencing
- Weapon: Foil
- Hand: left-handed
- Club: AZS AWF Warsaw
- FIE ranking: current ranking
Medal record
Men's Sabre
Representing Poland
World Championships
Bronze medal – third place	Beijing 2008	Team foil
European Championships
Gold medal – first place	2008 Kyiv	Team foil
Silver medal – second place	2006 İzmir	Team foil
Silver medal – second place	2013 Zagreb	Team foil
Bronze medal – third place	2012 Legnano	Individual

Michał Majewski (born 23 February 1987) is a Polish foil fencer, team bronze medallist in the 2008 World Fencing Championships and three-time team silver medallist at the European Fencing Championships.

== Career ==
Majewski was born in a sport-loving family: his mother was a gymnast and his father a fencer. He himself took up fencing under the direction of his uncle and godfather Piotr Majewski. He earned a bronze medal in the 2006 Junior European Championships in Poznań. In seniors, he climbed his first World Cup podium with a bronze medal in the 2006 Vancouver Grand Prix. He joined the national team that same year and won with them a silver medal in the 2006 European Championships. On his way back at the airport he was involved in a scuffle with a Turkish official and spent two months in prison.

In the 2007–08 season Majewski reached the final of the Montreal Grand Prix, where he was defeated by France's Erwann Le Péchoux. He took part in the 2008 World Championships held for events not included in the 2008 Summer Olympics programme. With Sławomir Mocek, Radosław Glonek and Marcin Zawada, Majewski reached the semi-finals, where Poland stumbled against Italy. They prevailed in the small final to earn a bronze medal. At the European Championships in Kyiv, he was stopped in the quarter-finals by Andriy Pogrebnyak of Ukraine and placed 5th. In the team event, Poland reached the final where they won gold medal. Majewski finished the season No.19 in World rankings, a personal best as of 2014.

In the 2008–09 season he reached the semi-finals in the Espinho Grand Prix in 2009, but was disqualified and served a two-year suspension after testing positive for cocaine. After his return he reached the semi-finals at the 2012 European Championships in Legnano, but fell against Benjamin Kleibrink and took a bronze medal, his best personal achievement as of 2014. In the 2012–13 season Poland reached again the final of the European Championships in Zabreb, but could not overcome Germany and came away with a silver medal.

== See also ==
- List of Polish fencers
