= Laurence Halsted =

British fencer (born 1984)

Laurence Cassøe Halsted
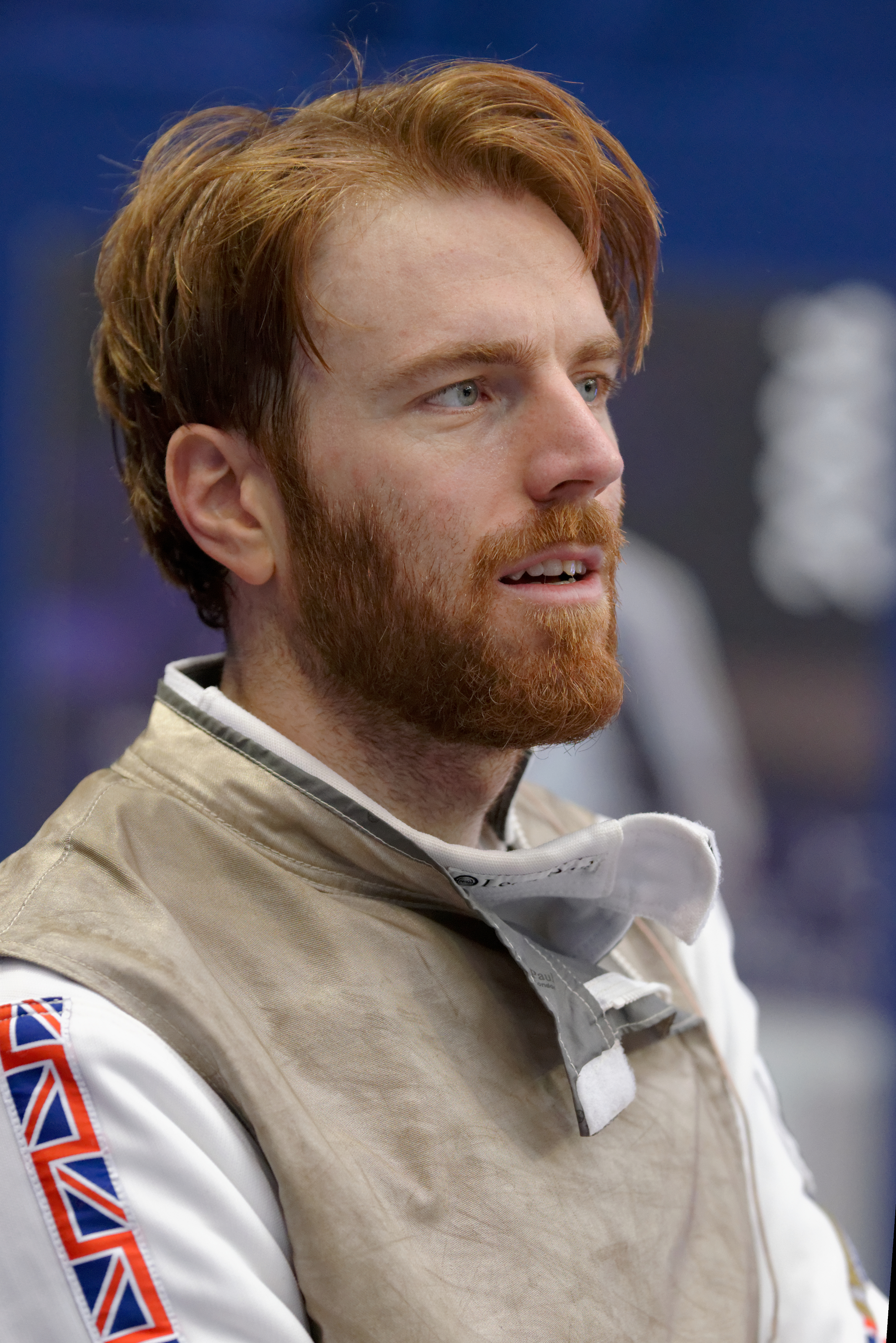

Personal information
- Nationality: British
- Born: 22 May 1984 (age 42) London, United Kingdom
- Home town: Copenhagen, Denmark
- Height: 1.83 m (6 ft 0 in)
- Weight: 81 kg (179 lb)

Fencing career
- Sport: Fencing
- Weapon: foil
- Hand: right-handed
- FIE ranking: current ranking
Medal record
Men's foil
Representing GBR
European Championships
Silver medal – second place	2008 Kiev	Individual
Bronze medal – third place	2009 Plovdiv	Individual
Bronze medal – third place	2010 Leipzig	Team
Bronze medal – third place	2016 Toruń	Team

Laurence Cassøe Halsted (born 22 May 1984) is a British foil fencer, silver medallist in the 2008 European Championships and author of Becoming A True Athlete: A Practical Philosophy For Flourishing Through Sport.

== Career ==
Halsted is the son of Nick Halsted, who fenced for Great Britain in the 1968 Summer Olympics, and Clare Henley-Halsted, who competed in foil in the 1972 and 1976 Summer Olympics. He took up fencing himself at the Finchley Foil club and soon showed promise, winning the 2001 Junior European Championships in Keszthely. He helped Great Britain to conquer a bronze medal in the 2002 competition.

After he graduated in social psychology at the University of Sussex, he joined the Lansdowne Club in London. He made his breakthrough at the 2008 European Championships in Kyiv: he saw off 2008 World silver medallist Andrea Baldini in the quarter-finals, then Ukraine's Andriy Pohrebnyak to reach the final. He lost to Italy's Andrea Cassarà and came away with a silver medal. The following year he was stopped in the semifinals by fellow countryman Richard Kruse and took a bronze medal. Also in 2009, he won the foil title at the British Fencing Championships. He finished the 2010–11 season no.16 in world rankings, a career best as of 2015.

At the 2012 Summer Olympics he competed in the team foil event, where Great Britain team beat Egypt in the first round, but lost to Italy in the quarter-final.

After taking a break from competitive fencing for 2 years, Laurence returned to the British team to help them qualify for the 2016 Rio de Janeiro Olympics. He finished 22nd in the individual event, losing to China's Haiwei Chen, and 6th in the team event, losing 45–43 in the quarter-finals to eventual winners, Russia.

Now located in Copenhagen, Denmark, Laurence Cassøe Halsted has since 1 January 2017 been Performance Director for the Danish Fencing Federation. On 26 August 2021, he published his first book called Becoming A True Athlete: A Practical Philosophy For Flourishing Through Sport.

His is known by his teammates as "The Kingslayer" due to his resemblance to HBO actor Nikolaj Coster-Waldau.
