= 2008 World Fencing Championships =

International fencing competition

2008 World Championships in Fencing
- Dates: April 18 – 20
- Host city: Beijing, China

The 2008 World Fencing Championships were held at the Olympic Green Convention Center in Beijing, China. The event took place from April 18 to April 20, 2008. It had men's team foil and women's team épée, both of which were not held at the 2008 Summer Olympics.

== Medal summary ==
Event	Gold	Silver	Bronze
Men's Team Foil	Italy; Andrea Baldini; Andrea Cassarà; Stefano Barrera; Salvatore Sanzo	Germany; Peter Joppich; Benjamin Kleibrink; Dominik Behr	Poland; Michał Majewski; Radosław Glonek; Marcin Zawada; Sławomir Mocek
Women's Team Épée	France; Laura Flessel; Hajnalka Kiraly-Picot; Maureen Nisima; Sarah Daninthe	China; Li Na; Luo Xiaojuan; Zhang Li; Zhong Weiping	Germany; Imke Duplitzer; Britta Heidemann; Marijana Markovic; Monika Sozanska

== Medal table ==
* Host nation (China)

Rank	Nation	Gold	Silver	Bronze	Total
1	France (FRA)	1	0	0	1
1	Italy (ITA)	1	0	0	1
3	Germany (GER)	0	1	1	2
4	China (CHN)*	0	1	0	1
5	Poland (POL)	0	0	1	1
Totals (5 entries)		2	2	2	6

== See also ==
- Fencing at the 2008 Summer Olympics
