= Alexandru Sirițeanu =

Romanian fencer (born 1984)

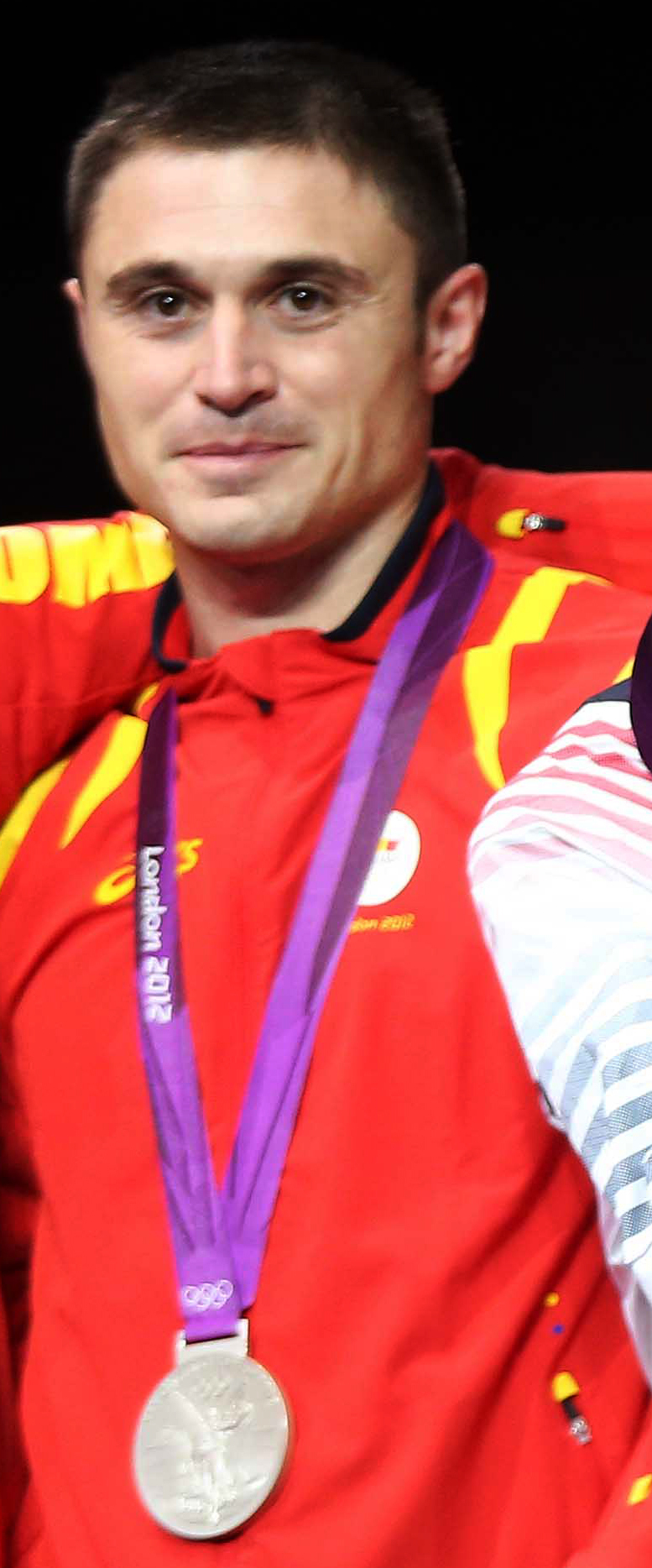

Personal information
- Full name: Alexandru Nicolae Sirițeanu
- Born: 16 April 1984 (age 42) Romania
- Height: 1.82 m (5 ft 11 1/2 in)
- Weight: 81 kg (179 lb; 12.8 st)

Fencing career
- Sport: Fencing
- Weapon: Sabre
- Hand: right-handed
- National coach: Mihai Covaliu
- Club: CSA Steaua
- Retired: 2012
- FIE ranking: current ranking
Medal record
Men's fencing
Representing Romania
Olympic Games
Silver medal – second place	2012 London	Team sabre
European Championships
Silver medal – second place	2009 Plovdiv	Team sabre
Silver medal – second place	2012 Legnano	Team sabre
Bronze medal – third place	2005 Zalaegerszeg	Team sabre

Alexandru Sirițeanu (Romanian pronunciation: [alekˈsandru siriˈt͡se̯anu]; born 16 April 1984) is a Romanian sabre fencer who competed in the 2012 Summer Olympics winning a silver medal in the sabre team event as a reserve.
