= Virgil Sălișcan =

Romanian fencer (born 1984)

Personal information
- Nationality: Romania
- Born: 26 May 1984 (age 42) Ploiești, Romania
- Height: 1.85 m (6 ft 1 in)
- Weight: 75 kg (165 lb)

Fencing career
- Sport: Fencing
- Weapon: Foil
- Hand: Left-handed
- Club: CSA Steaua București
- Head coach: Romică Molea
- Retired: 2013
- FIE ranking: ranking

Virgil Sălișcan (born 26 May 1984 in Ploiești) is a Romanian foil fencer.

Saliscan is a member of CSA Steaua in Bucharest and is coached by Molea Romica. He earned a bronze medal at the 2002 Junior European Championships in Conegliano and reached a quarter-final at the 2003 Junior World Championships in Trapani. That same season, he began fencing in the senior category. He qualified for the 2008 Summer Olympics in Beijing by earning a bronze medal in the qualifying tournament in Lisbon. where he competed in the individual foil event. He lost the first preliminary match to Great Britain's Richard Kruse, with a score of 6–15.

Sălișcan retired from competition after the 2012–13 season and became a coach at CSA Steaua.
