= Virginie Ujlaky =

Hungarian fencer (born 1984)

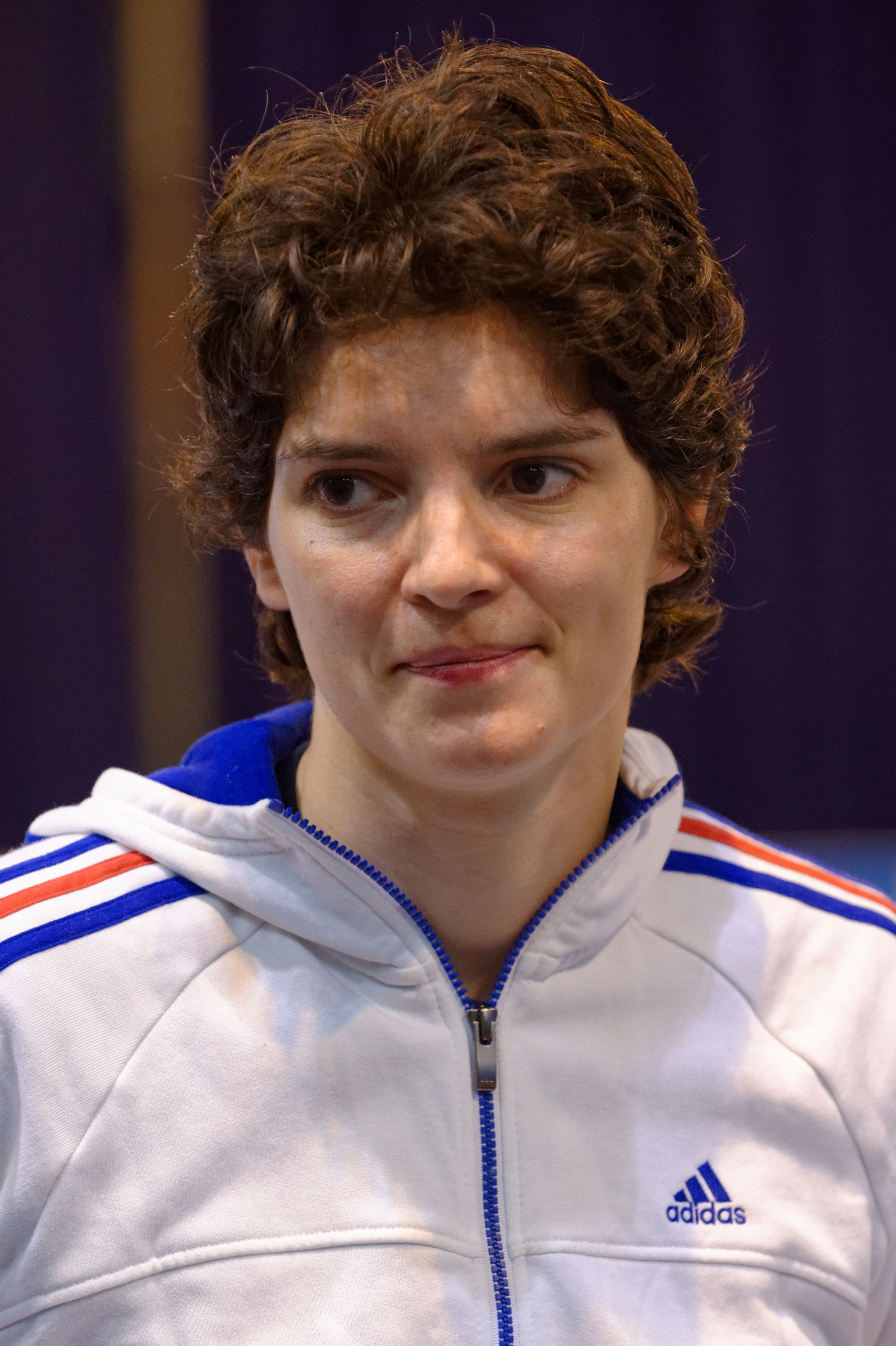
- Virginie Ujlaky in 2015

Personal information
- Born: 13 February 1984 (age 42) Neuilly-sur-Seine, France
- Height: 1.76 m (5 ft 9 in)
- Weight: 65 kg (143 lb)

Fencing career
- Sport: Fencing
- Weapon: foil
- Hand: right-handed
- FIE ranking: current ranking
Medal record
European Championships
Representing Hungary
Gold medal – first place	2007 Ghent	Team
Silver medal – second place	2008 Kyiv	Team
Representing France
Bronze medal – third place	2009 Plovdiv	Team

Virginie Ujlaky (born 13 February 1984 in Neuilly-sur-Seine) is a Hungarian fencer. She has a dual citizenship of France and Hungary.

She won the Junior World Fencing Championships for France in 2004. She was team European champion with Hungary in 2007. She also represented Hungary at the 2008 Summer Olympics in the women's team foil event, where they finished fourth.
