= Björn Hübner-Fehrer =

German sabre fencer (born 1986)

Björn Hübner
Personal information
- Full name: Björn Hübner-Fehrer (since 2019)
- Born: Björn Hübner; 22 January 1986 (age 40) Tauberbischofsheim, Germany
- Height: 1.82 m (6 ft 0 in)
- Weight: 83 kg (183 lb)

Fencing career
- Sport: Fencing
- Country: Germany
- Weapon: Sabre
- Hand: Right-handed
- Club: FC Tauberbischofsheim
- FIE ranking: current ranking
Medal record
European Games
Bronze medal – third place	2015 Baku	Team sabre
European Championships
Gold medal – first place	2019 Düsseldorf	Team sabre
Silver medal – second place	2011 Sheffield	Team sabre
Bronze medal – third place	2009 Plovdiv	Individual sabre
Bronze medal – third place	2010 Leipzig	Team sabre

Björn Hübner-Fehrer (born 22 January 1986 in Tauberbischofsheim, Germany), formerly known as Björn Hübner, is a German sabre fencer. He competed in the men's team sabre competition at the 2012 Summer Olympics.
