= Réka Benkó =

Hungarian fencer

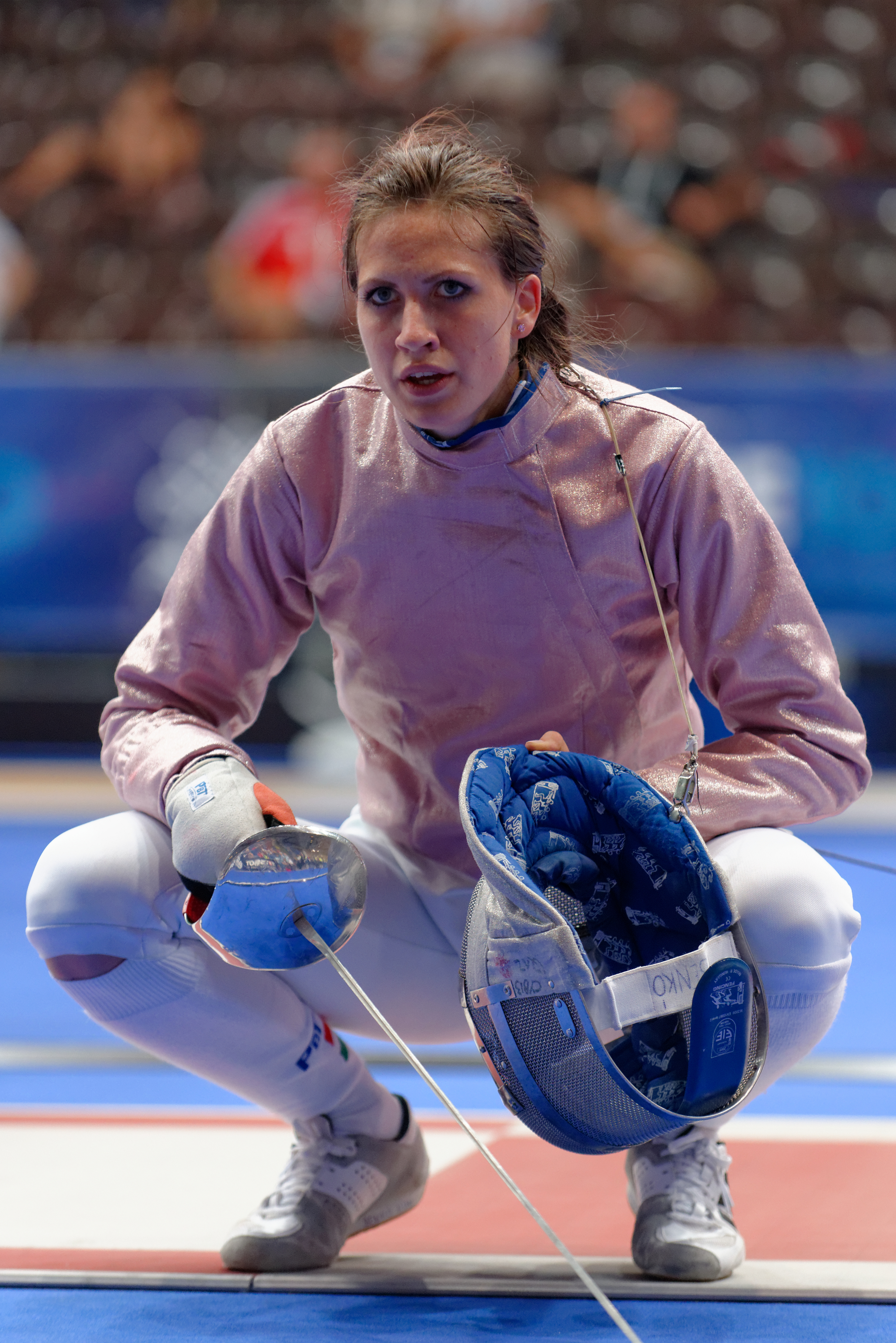
- At the 2013 World Fencing Championships

Personal information
- Born: 8 April 1989 (age 37)

Fencing career
- Sport: Fencing
- Weapon: sabre
- Hand: right-handed
- National coach: Tamás Kovács
- Club: Gödöllő EAC
- Head coach: Jószef Navarrete
- FIE ranking: current ranking
Medal record
Women's sabre
European Championships
| Bronze medal – third place | 2008 Kiev | Sabre |

Réka Benkó (born 8 April 1989) is a Hungarian sabre fencer, bronze medallist at the 2008 European Fencing Championships.

== Career ==
Benkó decided to take up fencing after watching Tímea Nagy's Olympic victory at the 2000 Summer Olympics in Sydney. Her first coach was László Schubert. She earned a silver medal at the 2006 European Junior Championships in Poznań and a team silver medal at the 2008 edition in Amsterdam. She also took a silver medal at the 2009 and 2011 U23 European Championships held respectively in Debrecen and Kazan.

At senior level she reached the semi-finals at the 2008 European Championships in Kiev, but she lost to Russia's Sofiya Velikaya and came away with a bronze medal. She was four-time champion of Hungary from 2009 to 2012. In the 2009–10 season she climbed her first World Cup podium with a silver medal at the Challenge New York after being defeated in the final by Olympic champion Mariel Zagunis. Benkó attempted to qualify to the 2012 Summer Olympics, but she lost to Germany's Alexandra Bujdoso in the table of 16 of the Olympic zone qualifying tournament in Bratislava. Upset by this failure, she took a four-month break from competition.
