= Aliaksandr Buikevich =

Belarusian fencer (born 1984)

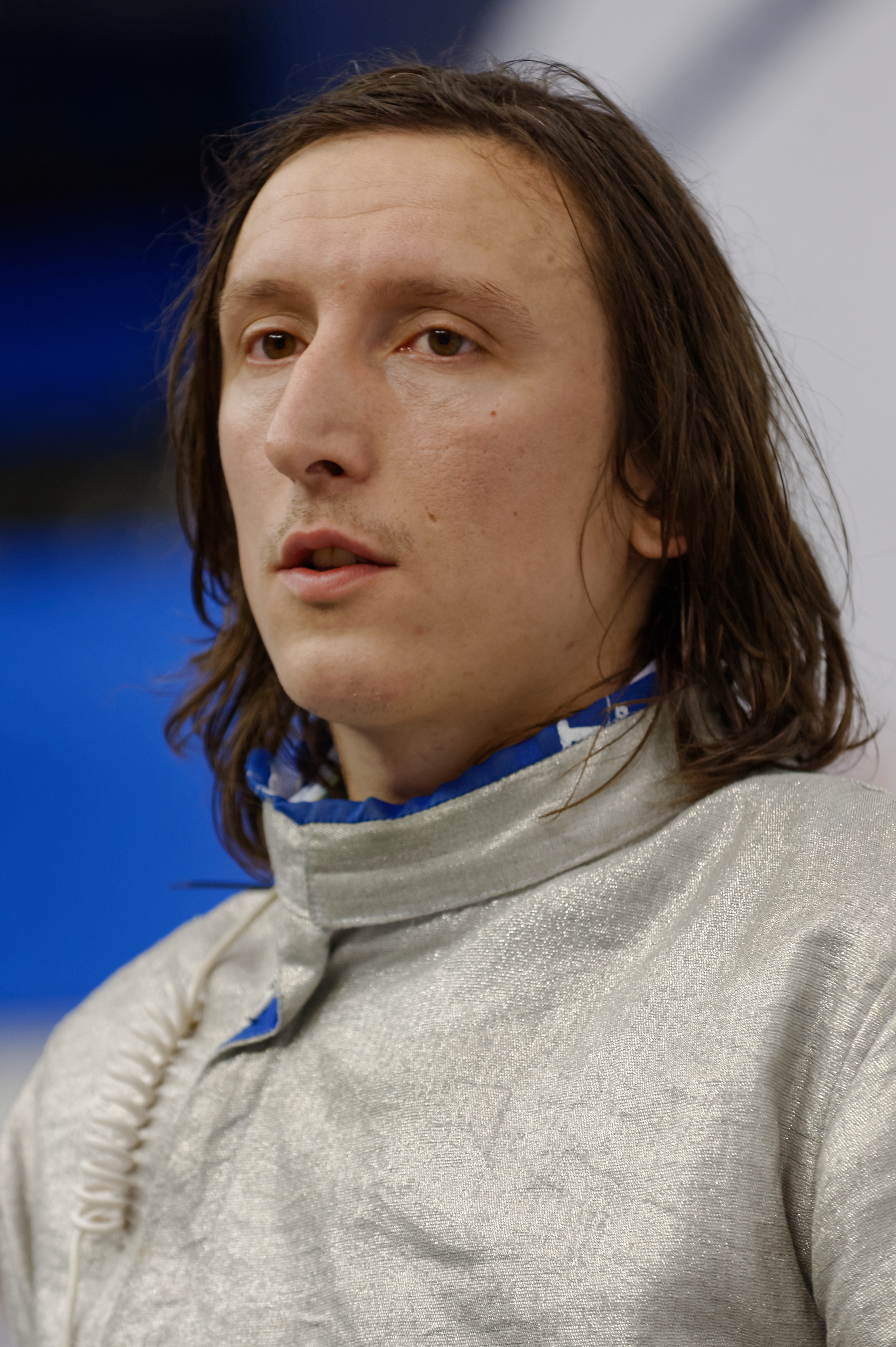

Personal information
- Nickname: "The Fierce"
- Born: 19 November 1984 (age 41) Brest, Byelorussian SSR, Soviet Union
- Home town: Minsk, Belarus
- Height: 1.91 m (6 ft 3 in)
- Weight: 80 kg (176 lb)

Fencing career
- Sport: Fencing
- Weapon: Sabre
- Hand: Left-handed
- National coach: Aliaksandr Surimto, Dmitry Lapkes, Grigoriy Lopatnev
- FIE ranking: current ranking
Medal record
Men's sabre fencing
Representing Belarus
World Championships
| Silver medal – second place | 2011 Catania | Team sabre |
European Championships
| Gold medal – first place | 2008 Kyiv | Individual sabre |
| Silver medal – second place | 2007 Ghent | Team sabre |
| Bronze medal – third place | 2008 Kyiv | Team sabre |
| Bronze medal – third place | 2012 Legnano | Individual sabre |

Aliaksandr Mikalayevich Buikevich (Belarusian: Аляксандар Мікалаевіч Буйкевіч, Russian: Александр микалаевич Буйкевич; born 19 November 1984) is a Belarusian sabre fencer, European champion in 2008 and team silver medallist at the 2011 World Championships in Catania. At the 2008 Summer Olympics, he reached the quarter-finals in the individual sabre, losing to Romania's Mihai Covaliu, while the Belarusian sabre team also reached the quarter-finals. At the 2012 Summer Olympics, he competed in the men's sabre, but was defeated in the table of 16 by Romania's Rareș Dumitrescu. The Belarusian team again reached the quarter-finals. Buikevich qualified for the 2016 Summer Olympics in Rio de Janeiro as the only Belarusian fencer. In men's sabre in the table of 32 he defeated Joseph Polossifakis of Canada. He could not advance to the quarter-finals as in the table of 16 he lost to the eventual winner Áron Szilágyi of Hungary, who claimed his second consecutive gold medal at the Olympics individual men's sabre. Buikevich finished 12th in the event.
