= Adrienn Hormay =

Hungarian fencer (born 1971)

Personal information
- Born: 7 October 1971 (age 54) Pécs, Hungary

Sport
- Sport: Fencing

Adrienn Hormay (born 7 October 1971) is a Hungarian fencer. She competed in the épée events at the 1996 and 2004 Summer Olympics. She won a gold medal at the 2008 European Fencing Championships.
