= Małgorzata Wojtkowiak =

Polish fencer (born 1982)

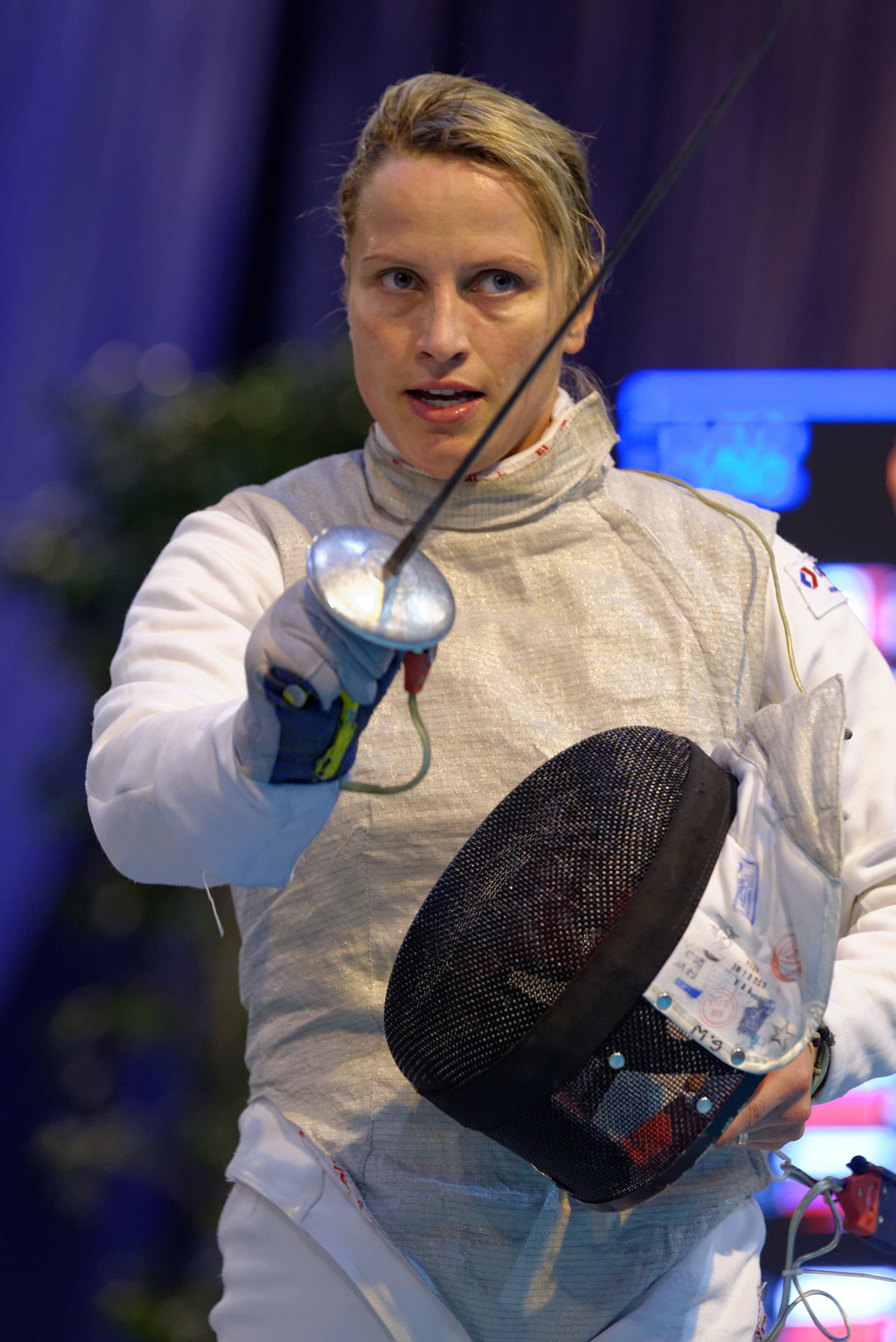

Personal information
- Born: 30 January 1982 (age 44) Poznań, Poland
- Height: 1.69 m (5 ft 7 in)
- Weight: 63 kg (139 lb)

Fencing career
- Sport: Fencing
- Weapon: Foil
- Hand: right-handed
- National coach: Paweł Kantorski
- Club: AZS-AWF Poznań
- Head coach: Paweł Kantorski
- FIE ranking: current ranking
Medal record
Foil
Representing Poland
World Championships
Gold medal – first place	2003 Havana	Team
Gold medal – first place	2007 St Petersburg	Team
Silver medal – second place	2002 Lisbon	Team
Bronze medal – third place	2004 New York	Team
European Championships
Bronze medal – third place	2000 Madeira	Team
Bronze medal – third place	2008 Kiev	Individual

Małgorzata Wojtkowiak (born January 30, 1982, in Poznań) is a Polish foil fencer, team world champion in 2003 and 2007 and individual bronze medallist at the 2008 European Championships. She represented Poland at the 2008 and 2012 Summer Olympics.

== Career ==
Wojtkowiak took up fencing at the age of twelve after a “come and try” session at school. She quickly showed promise and joined the cadet national team. She earned a bronze medal at the 1998 and 1999 Cadet World Championships. She was part of the team that won the gold medal at the 1999 Junior World Championships in Keszthely. She took an individual bronze and a team gold at the following edition in South Bend, then claimed a double gold haul at the 2001 edition at home in Gdańsk.

Wojtkowiak joined the senior national team for the 2000 European Championships in Madeira, where she earned a team bronze medal. She took a silver with the team at the 2002 World Championships in Lisbon, then a gold at the 2003 edition in Havana. Poland repeated the feat at the 2007 edition

She qualified to the 2008 Summer Olympics as a member of a top-ranked team. In the individual event she was defeated 15–8 on her first bout by Zhang Lei of China. In the team event Poland lost in the first round to the United States and finished seventh after the classification matches.

She qualified to the 2012 Summer Olympics with Poland again. In the individual event she lost in the first round again to China's Chen Jinyan. In the team event Poland was overcome by France in the first round. They beat successively Great Britain and the United States to place fifth.
