= Marijana Marković =

German fencer (born 1982)

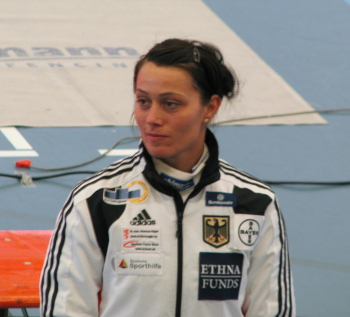

Medal record

Representing Germany

Women's Fencing

Olympic Games
Silver medal – second place	2004 Athens	Épée Team

World Championships
Silver medal – second place	2003 Havana	Team Épée
Bronze medal – third place	2006 Turin	Team Épée
Bronze medal – third place	2007 St. Petersburg	Team Épée
Bronze medal – third place	2008 Beijing	Team Épée
Bronze medal – third place	2009 Antalya	Team Épée

Marijana Marković (born 3 February 1982 in Frankfurt am Main) is a German épée fencer.

Marković won the bronze medal in the épée team event at the 2006 World Fencing Championships after beating Romania in the bronze medal match. She accomplished this with her teammates Imke Duplitzer, Claudia Bokel and Britta Heidemann.

== Achievements ==
2006 World Fencing Championships, team épée
