= James Kenber =

British 'International Elite Fencer'

James "Jaime" Kenber is a British fencer. As an 'International Elite Fencer' he won the Men's Foil Fencing Commonwealth Bronze Medal in the team discipline and ranked 6th overall in the individual event at the 2006 Commonwealth fencing championships. In 2005 he became United Kingdom National Champion at just 18 years of age.

== Education ==
Kenber, formerly a student at Millfield public school, read mathematics at Magdalen College, Oxford. He captained the Oxford University fencing squad, including eight international fencers, during the 2006/07 season. Under Kenber's stewardship Oxford defeated Cambridge in the 2007 Varsity Match, ending an unprecedented eight year losing streak; the worst in recorded match history.
