= Andriy Pohrebnyak =

Ukrainian fencer (born 1988)

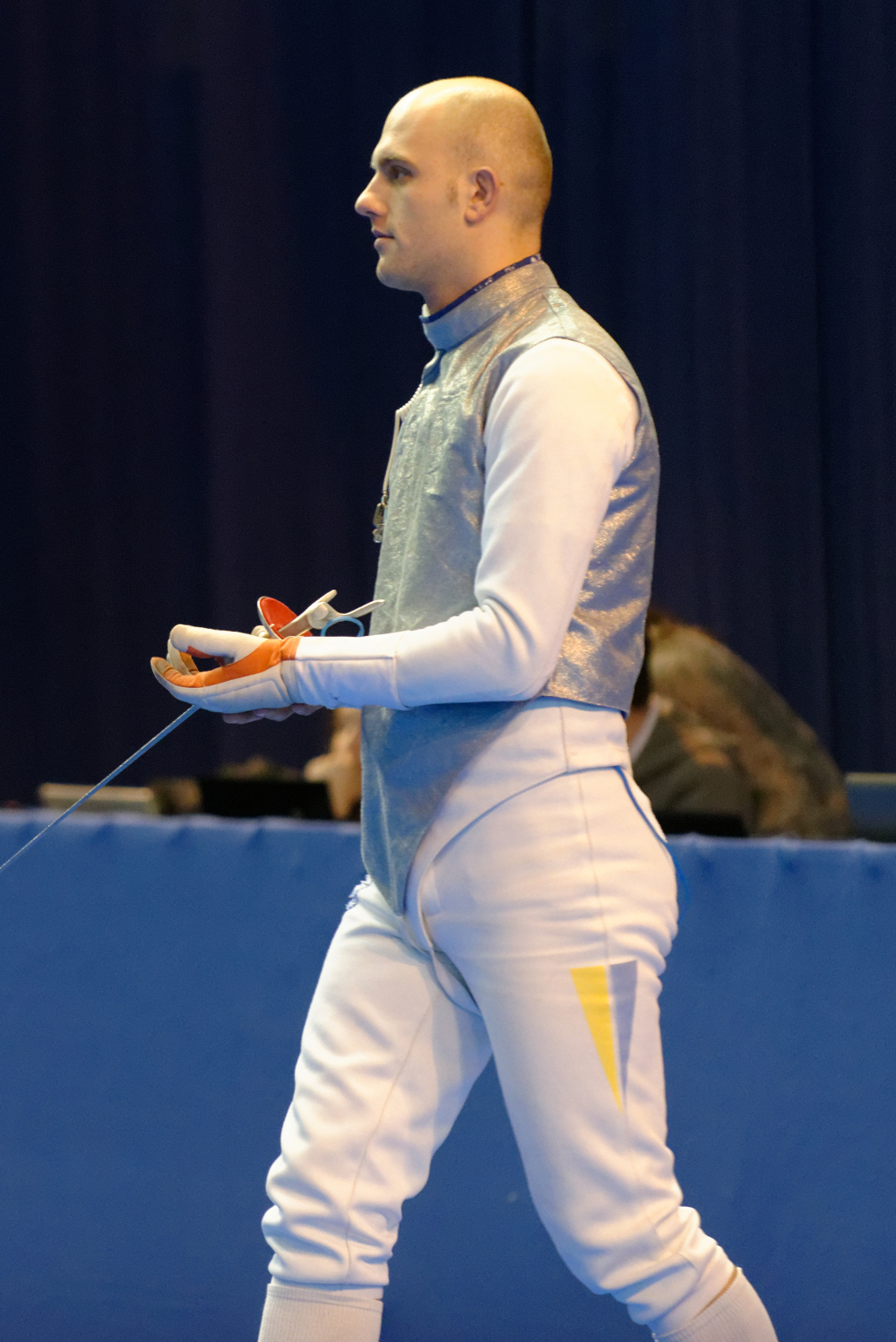
- At the 2013 Paris World Cup

Personal information
- Born: 11 February 1988 (age 38) Kyiv, Ukraine
- Height: 1.88 m (6 ft 2 in)
- Weight: 93 kg (205 lb)

Fencing career
- Sport: Fencing
- Country: Ukraine
- Weapon: Foil
- Hand: Left-handed
- National coach: Serhiy Haravskyi
- Club: Dynamo Kyiv
- FIE ranking: current ranking
Medal record
Men's foil fencing
Representing Ukraine
European Championships
Bronze medal – third place	2008 Kyiv	Individual foil

Andriy Pohrebnyak (Ukrainian: Андрій Погребняк; born 11 February 1988) is a Ukrainian foil fencer, bronze medallist in the 2008 European Fencing Championships.

Pohrebnyak won the Ukraine national championship in 2013 and 2014.
