= Mihai Covaliu =

Romanian fencer (born 1977)

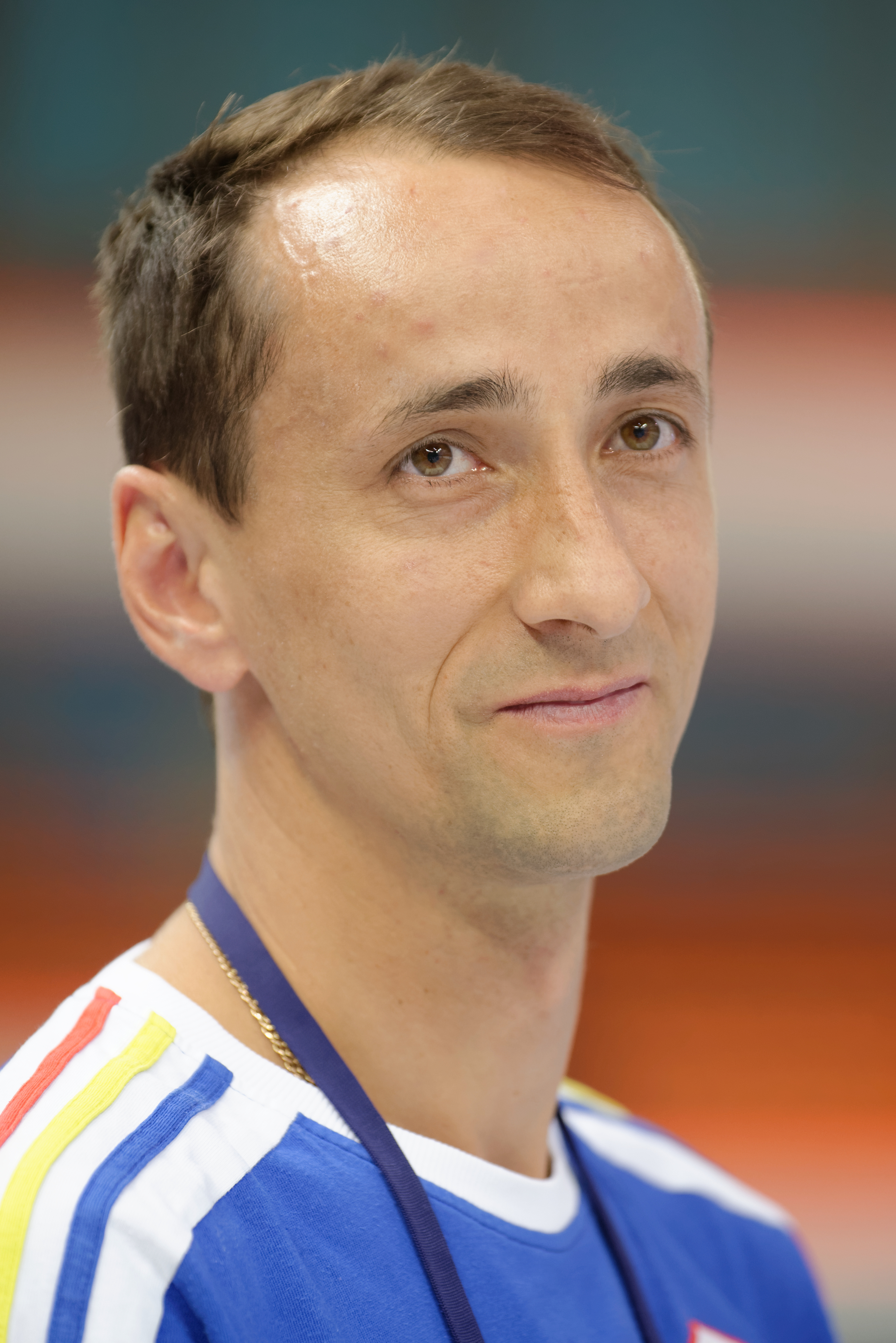
- At the 2015 World Fencing Championships

Personal information
- Full name: Mihai Claudiu Covaliu
- Nickname: Cova
- Nationality: Romanian
- Born: 5 November 1977 (age 48) Braşov, Romania
- Height: 1.81 m (5 ft 11 in)
- Weight: 71 kg (157 lb)

Fencing career
- Sport: Fencing
- Weapon: sabre
- Hand: right-handed
- Club: CS Dinamo București
- Retired: 2008
- FIE ranking: ranking (archive)
Medal record
Men's fencing
Representing Romania
Olympic Games
Gold medal – first place	2000 Sydney	Individual sabre
Bronze medal – third place	2008 Beijing	Individual sabre
World Championships
Gold medal – first place	2005 Leipzig	Individual sabre
Silver medal – second place	2003 Havana	Individual sabre
Bronze medal – third place	2001 Nîmes	Team sabre
Bronze medal – third place	2002 Lisbon	Individual sabre
European Championships
Gold medal – first place	2006 Izmir	Team sabre
Bronze medal – third place	2001 Koblenz	Team sabre
Bronze medal – third place	2002 Moscow	Team sabre
Bronze medal – third place	2005 Zalaegerszeg	Team sabre
Bronze medal – third place	2007 Ghent	Individual sabre
Bronze medal – third place	2008 Kyiv	Individual sabre

Mihai Claudiu Covaliu (born 5 November 1977 in Brașov) is a Romanian retired sabre fencer, Olympic champion in 2000 and world champion in 2005, and coach of the Romanian men's sabre team. He is also ex-president of the Romanian Fencing Federation and, from 2016, president of the Romanian Olympic and Sports Committee.

== Personal life ==
Covaliu's first sport was football. He began fencing at age nine, after coaches from CS Tractorul Brașov presented the sport to his school. His mother encouraged him to persevere despite the harsh training methods used at the time. In 1998 he joined the BNR Bucharest, a club supported by the National Bank of Romania, before transferring to CS Dinamo București, of which he is still a member as of 2014.

Covaliu married in 2001 Irina Draghici, a member of the women's national sabre team. They have two children, a son, Vlad and a daughter, Amalia. He graduated in physical education from the Alexandru Ioan Cuza University in Iași and holds a master's degree in sport management.

== Career ==
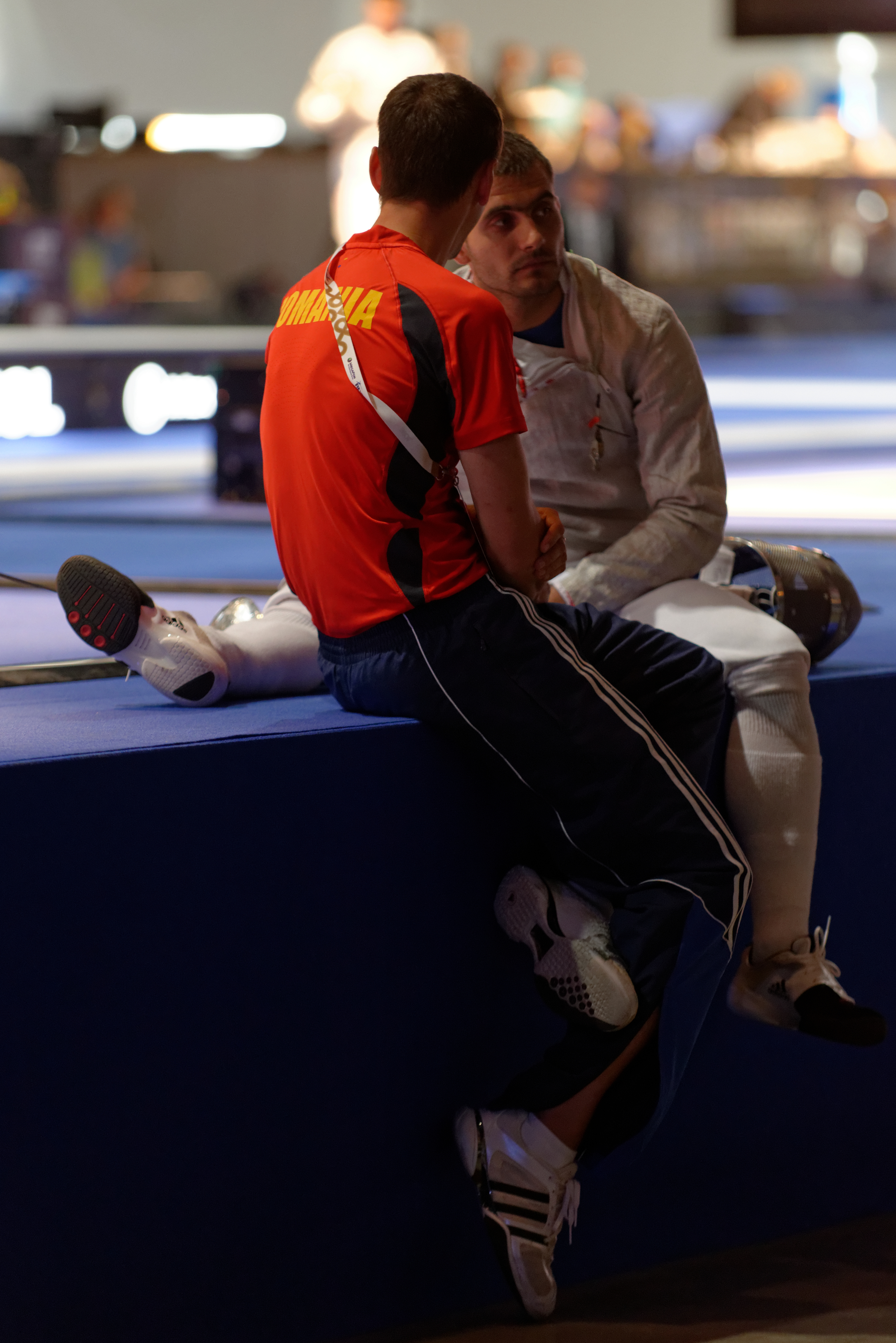
Covaliu (L) advises Tiberiu Dolniceanu during the 2013 World Fencing Championships

Covaliu underwent at CS Tractorul intensive training at the hand of several coaches and technicians, amongst which Mihai Ticușan, Gabriel Duția, Alexandru Chiculiță, Mihai Orița, Nicolae Dinu and Emilian Nuță. In 2000 at the 2000 Summer Olympics he created a surprise by reaching the final, beating medal prospect Damien Touya of France along the way. Covaliu then disposed of Mathieu Gourdain 15–12 to earn the first Romanian gold medal in sabre and become number one in FIE rankings. For this performance he was named Master Emeritus in sport and commander of the Order For Merit.

At the 2004 Summer Olympics, Covaliu was eliminated 15–14 in quarter-finals by Zsolt Nemcsik of Hungary, who eventually took the silver medal. Covaliu ended up number seven in the event. At the World Championships in Leipzig the year after, he made his way comfortably to the final, which he won 15–12 against three-time Olympic champion Stanislav Pozdnyakov of Russia. He was noted for his "enthusiasm, physical shape, virtuoso technique, simple fencing". He dedicated his medal to his son Vlad, born a day before the departure for Leipzig.

At the 2008 Summer Olympics Covaliu reached easily the quarter-finals. He had a tight 15–13 win against Aliaksandr Buikevich of Belarus, then met Nicolas Lopez of France. Despite having always beaten Lopez before, Covaliu was defeated 15–13 after leading 11–7 in the last period of the bout. He then met another Frenchman, Julien Pillet, and won 15–11 to earn the bronze medal.

After Beijing Covaliu retired to become the head coach of the Romanian sabre team. Under his training, Romania won the silver medal in the 2009 European Championships at Plovdiv, then the gold medal at the World Championships in Antalya, Rareș Dumitrescu taking the silver in the individual event. For this performance, Covaliu was made a knight in the Order of Faithful Service. Cosmin Hănceanu and Romania earned the silver at the 2010 World Fencing Championships in Paris, and Romania finished second in the London 2012 Summer Olympics. Covaliu was afterwards promoted to the rank of officer of the Order of Faithful Service.

In April 2013, Covaliu was elected president of the Romanian Fencing Federation after incumbent Ana Pascu decided not to run again. He remained the coach of the men's sabre team, who earned the silver at the 2013 World Fencing Championships in Budapest, Tiberiu Dolniceanu finishing at the third place in the individual event. The same year, Covaliu was inducted into the Hall of Fame of the International Fencing Federation.

== Links ==
- Mihai Covaliu at Olympics at Sports-Reference.com (archived)
- Mihai Covaliu at Olympics.com
- Mihai Covaliu's statistics on Nahouw.net
