= Javier Menéndez =

Spanish fencer

Javier Menéndez Fernández (born June 18, 1981, in Havana, Ciudad de La Habana, Cuba) is a Spanish fencer. He competed in the individual foil events at the 2008 Summer Olympics, where he seeded 18th. He won a bronze medal at the 2005 Almería Mediterranean games.
