= Benjamin Kleibrink =

German fencer (born 1985)

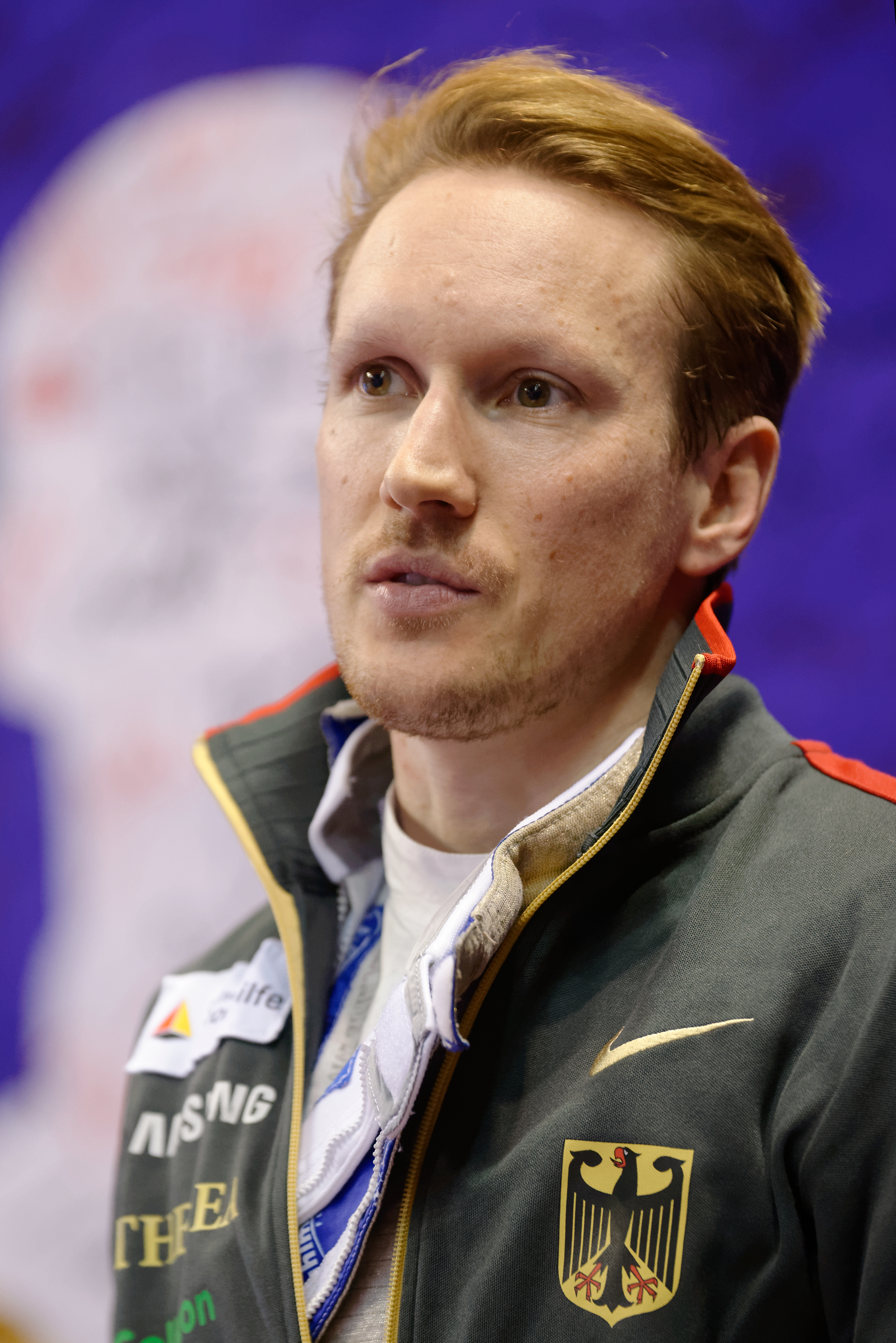

Personal information
- Full name: Benjamin Philip Kleibrink
- Born: 30 August 1985 (age 41) Düsseldorf, North Rhine-Westphalia, West Germany
- Height: 1.73 m (5 ft 8 in)
- Weight: 65 kg (143 lb)

Fencing career
- Sport: Fencing
- Country: Germany
- Weapon: Foil
- Hand: left-handed
- National coach: Ulrich Schreck
- FIE ranking: current ranking
Medal record
Olympic Games
Gold medal – first place	2008 Beijing	Men's foil
Bronze medal – third place	2012 London	Team foil
World Championships
Silver medal – second place	2006 Torino	Men's foil team
Silver medal – second place	St. Petersburg 2007	Men's foil team
Silver medal – second place	2008 Beijing	Men's team foil
Silver medal – second place	2009 Antalya	Men's foil team
Bronze medal – third place	2005 Leipzig	Men's team foil
Bronze medal – third place	St. Petersburg 2007	Men's foil
Bronze medal – third place	2011 Catania	Men's team foil
European Championships
Gold medal – first place	2007 Ghent	Men's team foil
Silver medal – second place	2007 Ghent	Men's foil
Silver medal – second place	2012 Legnano	Men's foil
Silver medal – second place	2019 Düsseldorf	Team foil
Bronze medal – third place	2006 İzmir	Men's foil
Bronze medal – third place	2009 Plovdiv	Team foil
Bronze medal – third place	2012 Legnano	Team foil

Benjamin Philip Kleibrink (born 30 July 1985, in Düsseldorf) is a German left-handed foil fencer, 2007 team European champion, two-time Olympian, two-time Olympic medalist, and 2008 Olympic champion.

== Medal Record ==
=== Olympic Games ===
Year	Location	Event	Position
2008	Beijing, China	Individual Men's Foil	1st
2012	London, United Kingdom	Team Men's Foil	3rd

=== World Championship ===
Year	Location	Event	Position
2005	Leipzig, Germany	Team Men's Foil	3rd
2006	Turin, Italy	Team Men's Foil	2nd
2007	St. Petersburg, Russia	Individual Men's Foil	3rd
2011	Catania, Italy	Team Men's Foil	3rd

=== European Championship ===
Year	Location	Event	Position
2007	Ghent, Belgium	Individual Men's Foil	2nd
2007	Ghent, Belgium	Team Men's Foil	1st
2009	Plovdiv, Bulgaria	Team Men's Foil	3rd
2012	Legnano, Italy	Individual Men's Foil	2nd
2012	Legnano, Italy	Team Men's Foil	3rd
2019	Düsseldorf, Germany	Team Men's Foil	2nd

=== Grand Prix ===
Date	Location	Event	Position
01/21/2005	Paris, France	Individual Men's Foil	3rd
01/27/2006	Paris, France	Individual Men's Foil	1st
04/28/2006	St. Petersburg, Russia	Individual Men's Foil	3rd
01/26/2007	Paris, France	Individual Men's Foil	1st
03/09/2007	St. Petersburg, Russia	Individual Men's Foil	3rd
05/11/2007	Shanghai, China	Individual Men's Foil	3rd
05/08/2009	Tokyo, Japan	Individual Men's Foil	2nd
05/14/2010	Tokyo, Japan	Individual Men's Foil	3rd

=== World Cup ===
Date	Location	Event	Position
01/28/2005	Venice, Italy	Individual Men's Foil	3rd
02/27/2005	Seoul, South Korea	Individual Men's Foil	1st
05/07/2005	Bonn, Germany	Individual Men's Foil	3rd
02/03/2006	A Coruña, Spain	Individual Men's Foil	1st
01/13/2007	Copenhagen, Denmark	Individual Men's Foil	3rd
02/15/2008	Venice, Italy	Individual Men's Foil	1st
03/01/2008	Bonn, Germany	Individual Men's Foil	2nd
01/28/2011	Paris, France	Individual Men's Foil	3rd
02/18/2011	A Coruña, Spain	Individual Men's Foil	2nd
05/03/2019	St. Petersburg, Russia	Individual Men's Foil	3rd
