= Roland Schlosser =

Austrian fencer

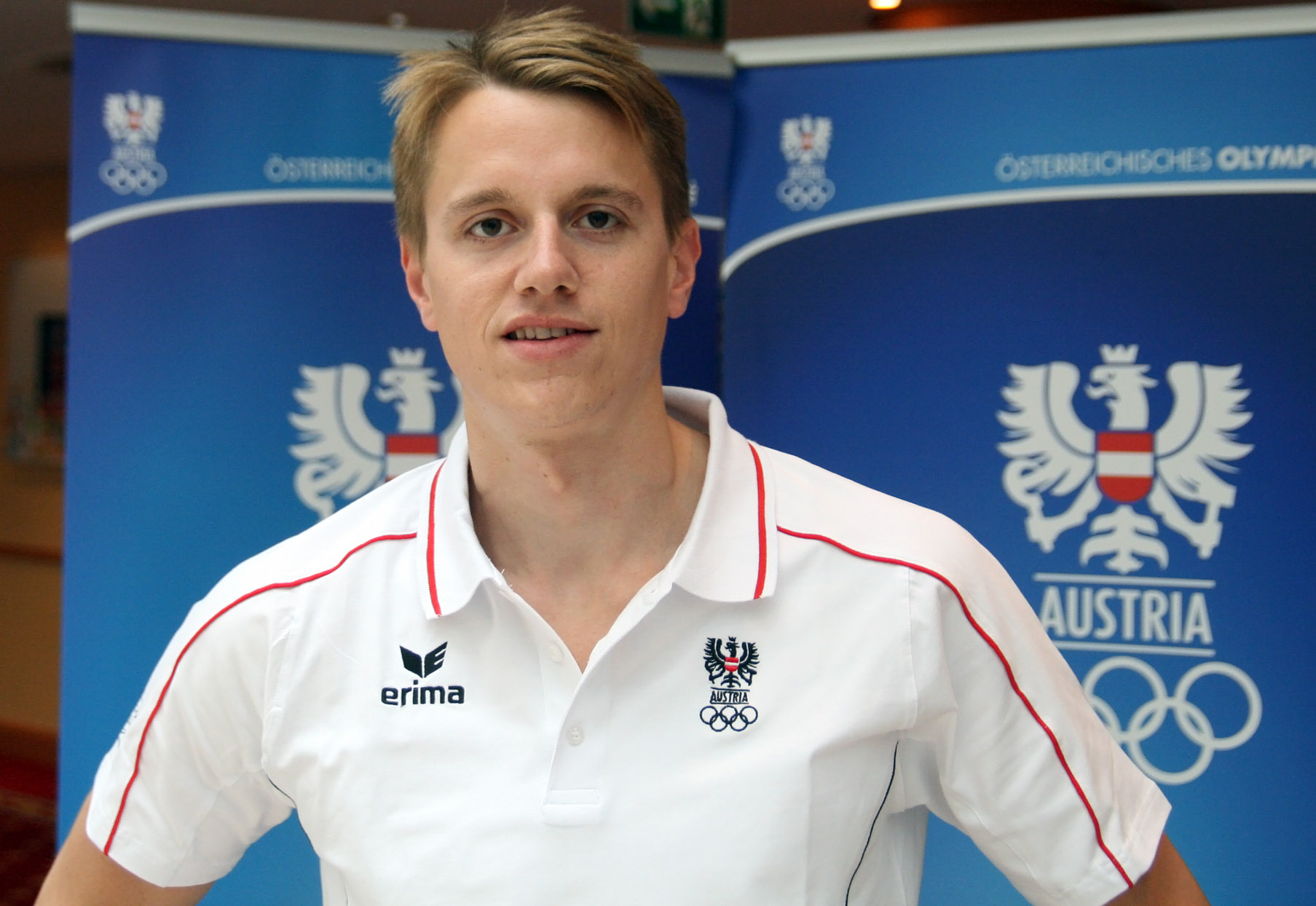

Personal information
- Born: 23 August 1982 (age 43) Bregenz, Austria

Sport
- Sport: Fencing

Roland Schlosser (born August 23, 1982) is an Austrian fencer. He competed in the individual foil events at the 2012 Summer Olympics, 2008 Summer Olympics and 2004 Summer Olympics.
