= Peter Joppich =

German fencer

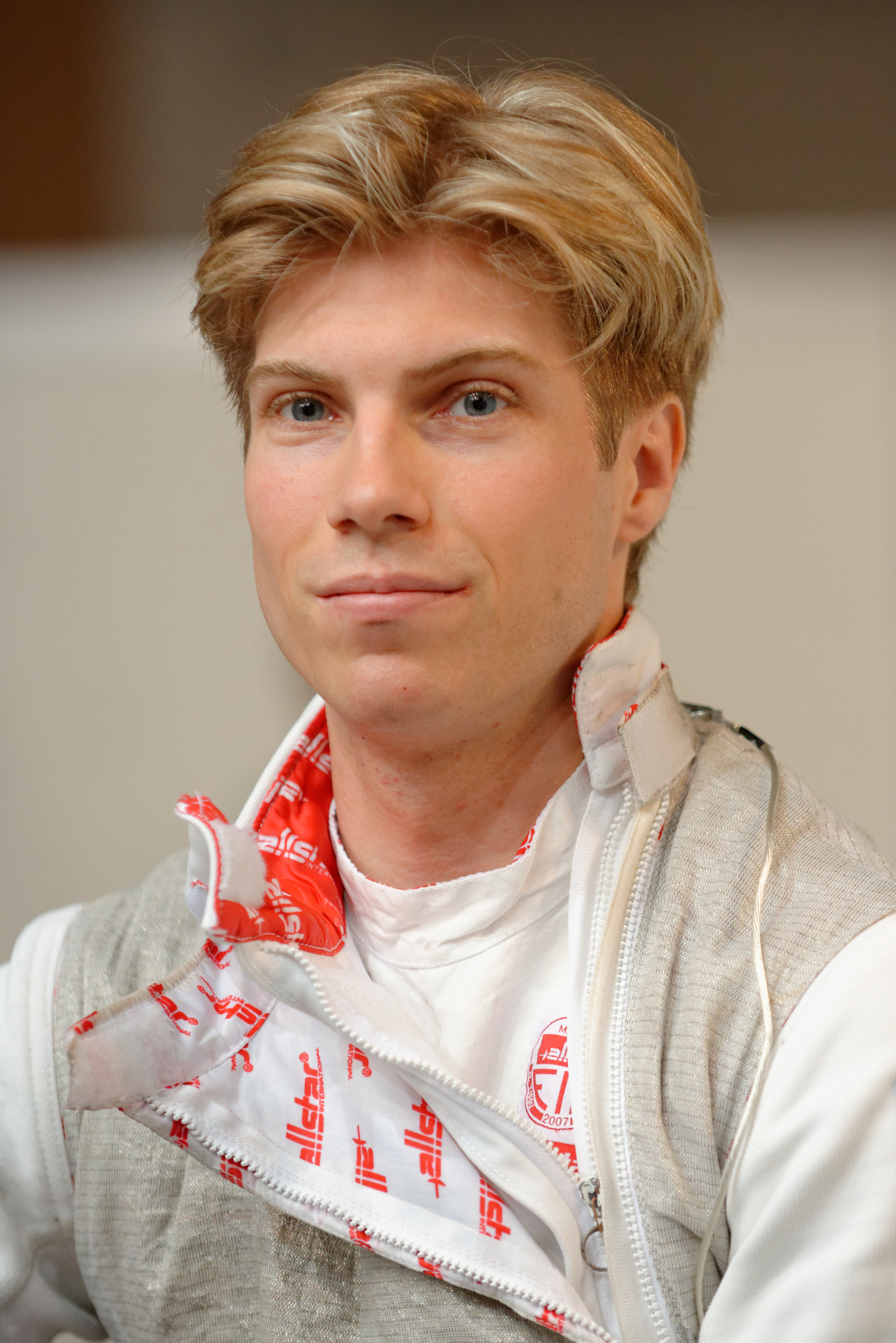
- Joppich at the 2013 World Fencing Championships

Personal information
- Nationality: German
- Born: 21 December 1982 (age 43) Koblenz, Rhineland-Palatinate, West Germany
- Height: 1.76 m (5 ft 9 in)
- Weight: 68 kg (150 lb)

Fencing career
- Sport: Fencing
- Country: Germany
- Weapon: foil
- Hand: Right-handed
- Club: Cercle d'escrime Melun Val de Seine
- FIE ranking: current ranking
Medal record
Representing Germany
Men's Fencing
Olympic Games
Bronze medal – third place	2012 London	Team foil
World Championships
Gold medal – first place	2002 Lisbon	Team foil
Gold medal – first place	2003 Havana	Foil
Gold medal – first place	2006 Turin	Foil
Gold medal – first place	2007 St. Petersburg	Foil
Gold medal – first place	2010 Paris	Foil
Silver medal – second place	2006 Turin	Team foil
Silver medal – second place	2007 St. Petersburg	Team foil
Silver medal – second place	2008 Beijing	Team foil
Silver medal – second place	2009 Antalya	Team foil
Bronze medal – third place	2003 Havana	Team foil
Bronze medal – third place	2005 Leipzig	Team foil
Bronze medal – third place	2009 Antalya	Foil
Bronze medal – third place	2011 Catania	Team foil
European Championships
Gold medal – first place	2007 Gent	Team foil
Gold medal – first place	2013 Zagreb	Foil
Gold medal – first place	2013 Zagreb	Team foil
Silver medal – second place	2019 Düsseldorf	Team foil
Bronze medal – third place	2009 Plovdiv	Team foil
Bronze medal – third place	2012 Legnano	Team foil
Bronze medal – third place	2014 Strasbourg	Foil
Bronze medal – third place	2015 Montreux	Team foil

Peter Joppich (born 21 December 1982) is a German foil fencer.

He is a five-time World Champion in Foil with four Individual titles and one Team title. Joppich won the gold medal in 2010 World Fencing Championships after beating Lei Sheng 15–11 at Championnats du Monde, Paris. He was also the winner of the World Fencing Championships in St Petersburg in 2007 after beating Andrea Baldini 15–9, Turin in 2006 after beating Baldini 15–14, and Havana in 2003. He won his first World Championship Individual Title when he was just 21 years old.

Joppich credits his success to former German fencer and Olympic gold medallist Ulrich Schreck. For more than 10 years, Schreck instructed Joppich during the latter's training at the Federal Training Centre in Bonn. He has competed in five Olympic Games – Athens 2004, Beijing 2008, London 2012, Rio de Janeiro 2016, and Tokyo 2021. He finished sixth, fifth, eleventh, and twelfth respectively.
