= Stefano Barrera =

Italian foil fencer (born 1980)

- Born: 12 January 1980 (age 46); Siracusa
- Occupation: Foil fencer and Coach.

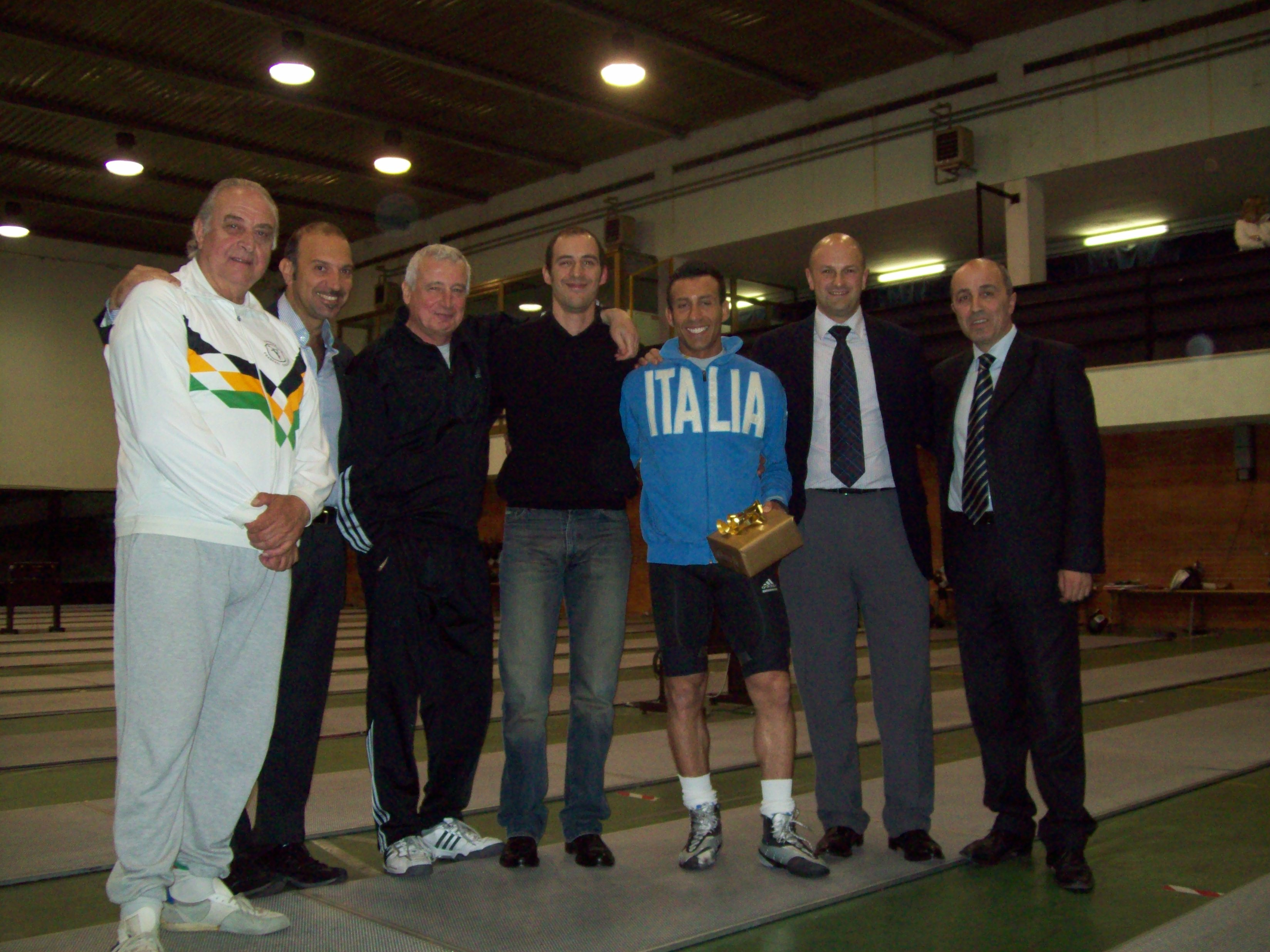
The Frascati fencing club awards Stefano Barrera (third from the right) with a prize after his gold medal in 2008. His coach Salvatore Di Naro is also present (first from the left)

Stefano Barrera (born 12 January 1980, in Siracusa) is an Italian foil fencer. Now retired and became a foil coach at Club Scherma Siracusa.

== Biography ==
Barrera won the bronze medal for the foil 2006 World Fencing Championships after he lost 15-13 to Andrea Baldini in the semi-final. Two years later, in the 2008 World Fencing Championships he won the team competition. He belongs to Centro Sportivo Carabinieri, but he also trains with A.S. Frascati Scherma. He won the bronze medal after a one-year and a half stop due to medical problems.

== Achievements ==
2008 World Fencing Championships, foil, team
2006 World Fencing Championships, foil, individual
1998 World Youth Fencing Championships, foil, individual
1998 World Youth Fencing Championships, foil, team
1997 World Cadet Fencing Championships, foil, individual
1996 World Cadet Fencing Championships, foil, individual
