= Andrea Cassarà =

Italian fencer (born 1984)

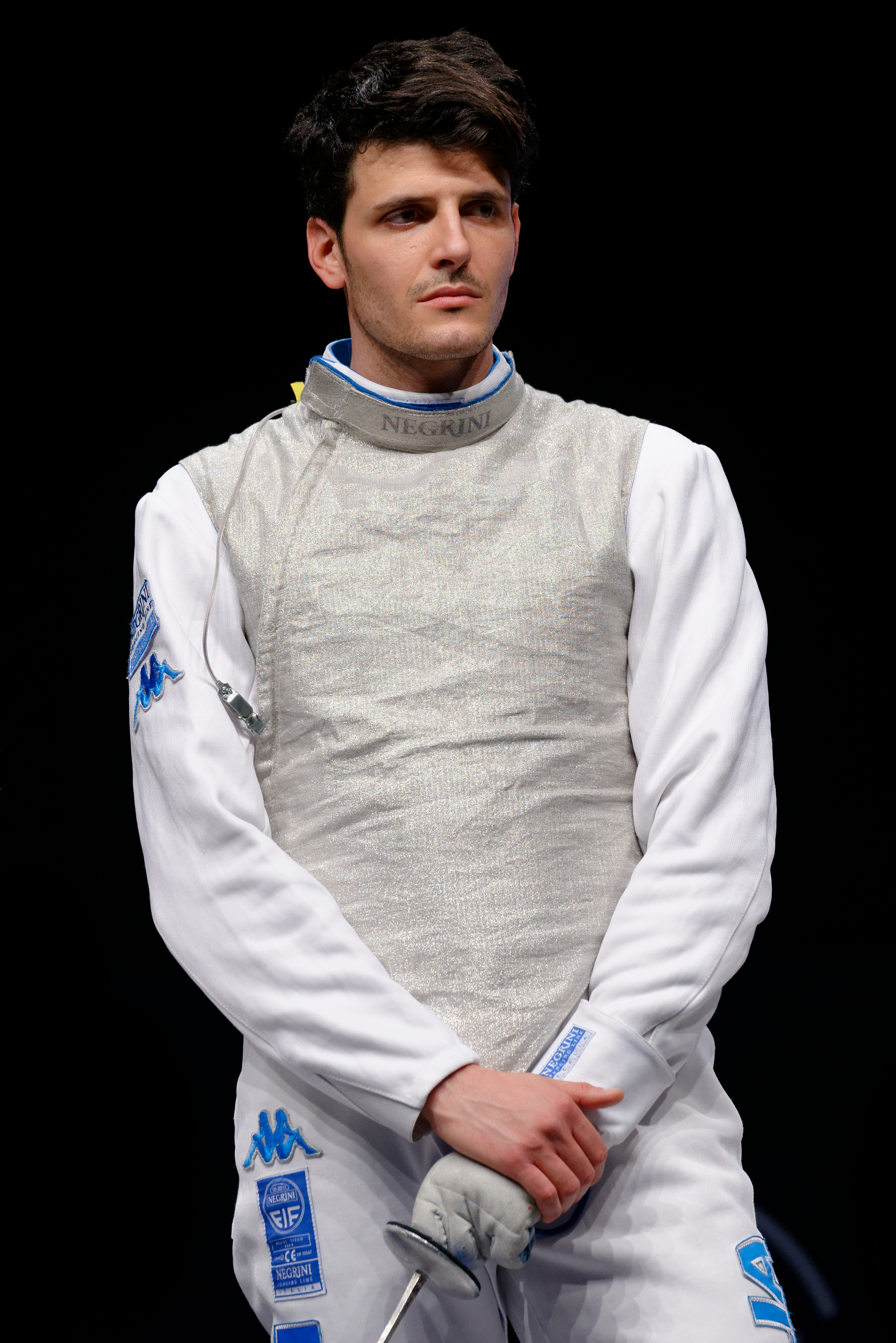

Personal information
- Born: 3 January 1984 (age 42) Passirano, Italy
- Height: 1.93 m (6 ft 4 in)
- Weight: 93 kg (205 lb)

Fencing career
- Sport: Fencing
- Country: Italy
- Weapon: Foil
- Hand: Left-handed
- National coach: Andrea Cipressa
- Club: CS Carabinieri
- FIE ranking: current ranking
Medal record
Olympic Games
Gold medal – first place	2004 Athens	Team foil
Gold medal – first place	2012 London	Team foil
Bronze medal – third place	2004 Athens	Individual foil
World Championships
Gold medal – first place	2003 Havana	Team foil
Gold medal – first place	2008 Beijing	Team foil
Gold medal – first place	2011 Catania	Individual foil
Gold medal – first place	2013 Budapest	Team foil
Gold medal – first place	2015 Moscow	Team foil
Gold medal – first place	2017 Leipzig	Team foil
Gold medal – first place	2018 Wuxi	Team foil
Silver medal – second place	2005 Leipzig	Team foil
Bronze medal – third place	2003 Havana	Individual foil
Bronze medal – third place	2006 Turin	Team foil
Bronze medal – third place	2014 Kazan	Team foil
Bronze medal – third place	2019 Budapest	Team foil
European Championships
Gold medal – first place	2002 Moscow	Individual foil
Gold medal – first place	2002 Moscow	Team foil
Gold medal – first place	2005 Zalaegerszeg	Individual foil
Gold medal – first place	2005 Zalaegerszeg	Team foil
Gold medal – first place	2008 Kyiv	Individual foil
Gold medal – first place	2009 Plovdiv	Team foil
Gold medal – first place	2011 Sheffield	Team foil
Gold medal – first place	2012 Legnano	Team foil
Gold medal – first place	2015 Montreux	Individual foil
Silver medal – second place	2010 Leipzig	Team foil
Silver medal – second place	2011 Sheffield	Individual foil
Silver medal – second place	2014 Strasbourg	Team foil
Silver medal – second place	2016 Toruń	Team foil
Silver medal – second place	2018 Novi Sad	Team foil
Bronze medal – third place	2019 Düsseldorf	Team foil

Andrea Cassarà (born 3 January 1984) is an Italian left-handed foil fencer, two-time individual European champion, 2011 individual world champion, and three-time Olympics medalist.

== Fencing career ==
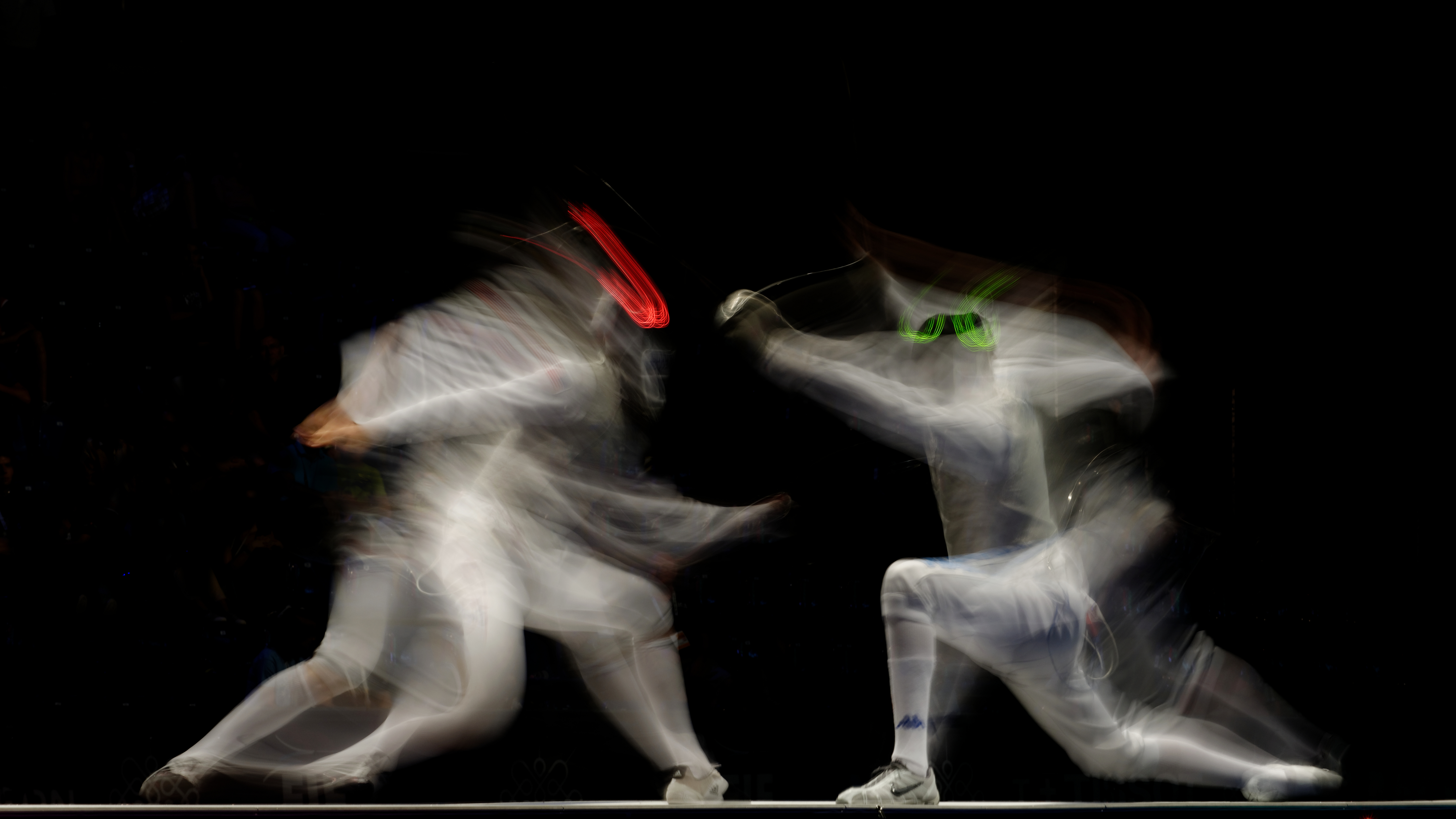
Race Imboden (left) fences against Italy's Andrea Cassarà (right) in the men's foil team final of the 2013 World Fencing Championships 2013 at Syma Hall in Budapest, 12 August 2013.

Cassarà won a bronze medal in the individual men's foil event and a gold medal in the team men's foil event at the 2004 Athens Olympic Games, and a gold medal in the team men's foil event at the 2012 London Olympic Games. He competed in the 2004 Athens Olympic Games, the 2008 Beijing Olympic Games (as a replacement for suspended world #1 foil fencer Andrea Baldini), the 2012 London Olympic Games, and the 2016 Rio de Janeiro Olympic Games.

Cassarà's medal record at world fencing championships include:

- Bronze medal in the individual men's foil event and gold medal in the team men's foil event at the 2003 World Fencing Championships in Havana, Cuba
- Silver medal in the team men's foil event at the 2005 World Fencing Championships in Leipzig, Germany
- Bronze medal in the team men's foil event at the 2006 World Fencing Championships in Turin, Italy
- Gold medal in the team men's foil event at the 2008 World Fencing Championships in Beijing, China
- Gold medal in the team men's foil event at the 2009 World Fencing Championships in Antalya, Turkey
- Silver medal in the team men's foil event at the 2010 World Fencing Championships in Paris, France
- Gold medal in the individual men's foil event at the 2011 World Fencing Championships in Catania, Italy
- Gold medal in the team men's foil event at the 2013 World Fencing Championships in Budapest, Hungary
- Bronze medal in the team men's foil event at the 2014 World Fencing Championships in Kazan, Russia
- Gold medal in the team men's foil event at the 2015 World Fencing Championships in Moscow, Russia
- Gold medal in the team men's foil event at the 2017 World Fencing Championships in Leipzig, Germany,
- Gold medal in the team men's foil event at the 2018 World Fencing Championships in Wuxi, China
- Bronze medal in the team men's foil event at the 2019 World Fencing Championships in Budapest, Hungary

Cassarà won a gold medal in the individual men's foil event at the 2008 European Fencing Championships in Kyiv, Ukraine, a silver medal in the individual men's foil event at the 2011 European Fencing Championships in Sheffield, United Kingdom, and a gold medal in the individual men's foil event at the 2015 European Fencing Championships in Montreux, Switzerland. Between 2003 and 2018, Cassarà won 11 FIE Men's Foil Grand Prix titles, in addition to six silver medals and six bronze medals. Between 2003 and 2020, Cassarà won 17 FIE Men's Foil World Cup titles, in addition to 13 silver medals, and seven bronze medals.
