= Salvatore Sanzo =

Italian fencer

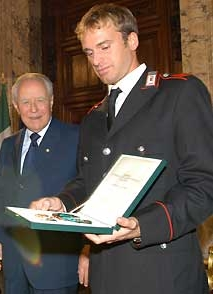

Personal information
- Born: 26 November 1975 (age 50) Pisa, Italy

Sport
- Country: Italy
- Sport: Fencing
- Event: Foil
Medal record
Men's fencing
Representing Italy
Olympic Games
Gold medal – first place	2004 Athens	Team foil
Silver medal – second place	2004 Athens	Foil Individual
Bronze medal – third place	2000 Sydney	Team foil
Bronze medal – third place	2008 Beijing	Foil Individual

Salvatore Sanzo (born 26 November 1975) is an Italian Olympic fencer. He won a team gold and individual silver medal in Athens and an individual bronze medal in Beijing in foil.

== Biography ==
In 2002 he married the teammate Frida Scarpa, the couple divorced after a few years.

== Achievements ==
Olympic Games

- Foil team (2004)
- Foil individual (2004)
- Foil individual (2008) and Foil team (2000)

World Championships

- Foil individual (2001, 2005) and Foil team (2003, 2008)
- Foil team (2005)
- Foil individual (1998) and Foil team (1997, 2006)

== See also ==
- Italy national fencing team – Multiple medallist
