= Sławomir Mocek =

Polish fencer

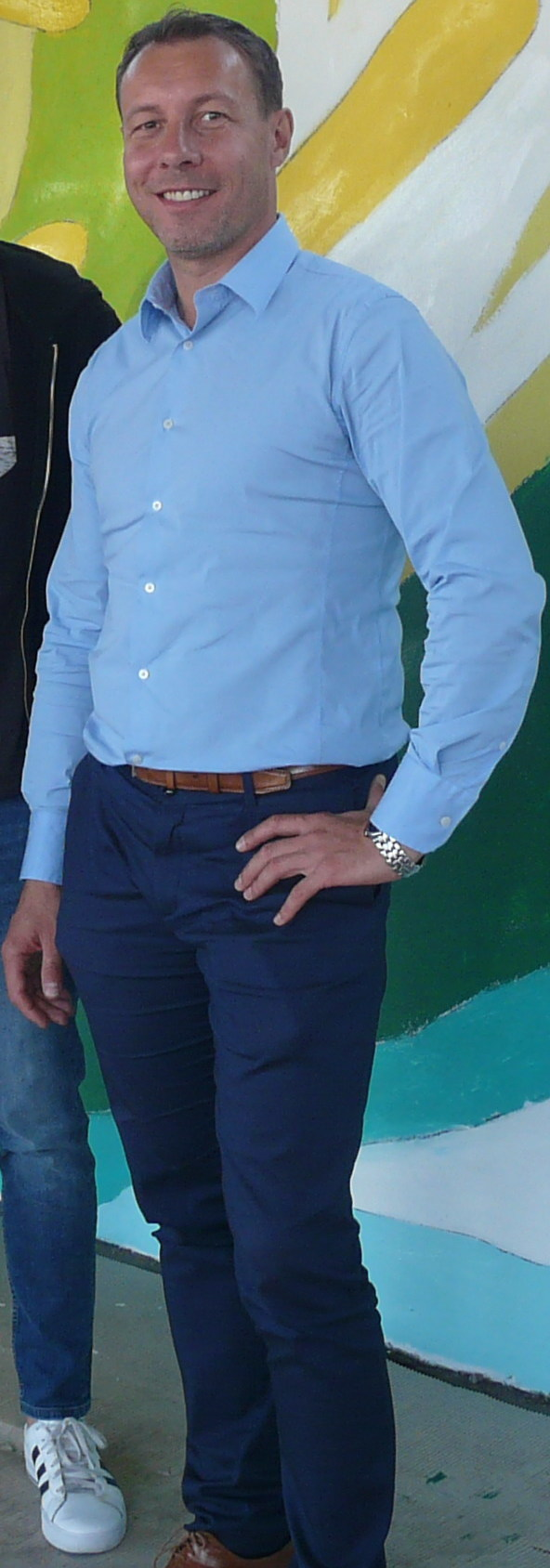
- President of the City of Leszno Łukasz Borowiak and fencer Sławomir Mocek.

Personal information
- Born: 27 October 1976 (age 50) Leszno, Poland

Sport
- Sport: Fencing
Medal record
Representing Poland
World Championships
Gold medal – first place	1998 La Chaux-de-Fonds	Team foil
Silver medal – second place	2001 Nîmes	Team foil
Bronze medal – third place	1999 Seoul	Team foil
Bronze medal – third place	2008 Beijing	Team foil
Summer Universiade
Silver medal – second place	1999 Palma de Mallorca	Team foil
Bronze medal – third place	1999 Palma de Mallorca	Individual foil

Sławomir Marcin Mocek (born 27 October 27, 1976) is a Polish fencer. He competed in the foil events at the 2000 and 2008 Summer Olympics.
