= Women's foil at the 2006 World Fencing Championships =

- Venue: Oval Lingotto
- Location: Turin, Italy
- Dates: 1 October

Medalists
gold medal	Margherita Granbassi	Italy
silver medal	Valentina Vezzali	Italy
bronze medal	Giovanna Trillini	Italy
bronze medal	Aida Mohamed	Hungary

The Women's foil event took place on October 1, 2006 at Oval Lingotto.

== Draw ==
=== Finals ===
Quarter-finals
(Italy) Valentina Vezzali	11
(Italy) Elisa Di Francisca	5
(Russia) Ianna Rouzavina	5
(Hungary) Aida Mohamed	6
(South Korea) Nam Hyun-Hee	9
(Italy) Margherita Granbassi	10
(Italy) Giovanna Trillini	15
(Russia) Aida Chanaeva	4

Semi-finals
(Italy) Valentina Vezzali	15
(Hungary) Aida Mohamed	3
(Italy) Margherita Granbassi	15
(Italy) Giovanna Trillini	8

Final
(Italy) Valentina Vezzali	6
(Italy) Margherita Granbassi	7

=== Top half ===
==== Section 1 ====
Round of 64
(Italy) Valentina Vezzali	13
(Venezuela) Marianny Rincones	1
(China) Liu Yuan	11
(Hungary) Gabriella Varga	15
(Poland) Magdalena Mroczkiewicz	10
(South Korea) Jung Gil-ok	15
(Romania) Andreea Andrei	5
(Russia) Svetlana Boyko	15
(France) Corinne Maîtrejean	15
(Canada) Annie-Claude Therrien	5
(China) Huang Jialing	15
(Ukraine) Olha Leleiko	12
(Romania) Daniela Tanase	2
(Romania) Cristina Ghita	15
(Argentina) Alejandra Carbone	4
(Italy) Elisa Di Francisca	8

Round of 32
(Italy) Valentina Vezzali	15
(Hungary) Gabriella Varga	10
(South Korea) Jung Gil-ok	10
(Russia) Svetlana Boyko	9
(France) Corinne Maîtrejean	14
(China) Huang Jialing	15
(Romania) Cristina Ghita	10
(Italy) Elisa Di Francisca	13

Round of 16
(Italy) Valentina Vezzali	15
(South Korea) Jung Gil-ok	9
(China) Huang Jialing	8
(Italy) Elisa Di Francisca	12

Quarterfinals
(Italy) Valentina Vezzali	11
(Italy) Elisa Di Francisca	5

==== Section 2 ====
Round of 64
(Russia) Ianna Rouzavina	6
(Slovakia) Gyongy Hanzelova	4
(Israel) Delila Hatuel	5
(France) Melanie Moumas	6
(China) Sun Chao	11
(Japan) Yoko Makishita	15
(Austria) Sandra Kleinberger	10
(Romania) Cristina Stahl	12
(Russia) Julia Khakimova	15
(China) Chen Jinyan	11
(Poland) Karolina Chlewinska	2
(Hungary) Aida Mohamed	15
(Egypt) Shaimaa El Gammal	15
(Hungary) Katalin Varga	5
(Portugal) Debora Nogueira	2
(Poland) Sylwia Gruchała	15

Round of 32
(Russia) Ianna Rouzavina	13
(France) Melanie Moumas	10
(Japan) Yoko Makishita	6
(Romania) Cristina Stahl	15
(Russia) Julia Khakimova	14
(Hungary) Aida Mohamed	15
(Egypt) Shaimaa El Gammal	2
(Poland) Sylwia Gruchała	15

Round of 16
(Russia) Ianna Rouzavina	12
(Romania) Cristina Stahl	11
(Hungary) Aida Mohamed	8
(Poland) Sylwia Gruchała	7

Quarterfinals
(Russia) Ianna Rouzavina	5
(Hungary) Aida Mohamed	6

=== Bottom half ===
==== Section 3 ====
Round of 64
(South Korea) Nam Hyun-Hee	15
(Chile) Barbara Garcia Azua	7
(South Korea) Jeon Hee-Sook	15
(Poland) Anna Rybicka	8
(Canada) Monica Kwan	7
(United States) Emily Cross	15
(Austria) Barbara Koppenwallner	5
(Japan) Chieko Sugawara	15
(Italy) Margherita Granbassi	10
(United States) Doris Willette	5
(Austria) Anna Docker	6
(Germany) Carolin Golubytskyi	13
(Ukraine) Oksana Dmytruk	7
(Netherlands) Djinn Geurts	10
(Vietnam) Nguyen Thi Nguyet	8
(Hungary) Edina Knapek	15

Round of 32
(South Korea) Nam Hyun-Hee	15
(South Korea) Jeon Hee-Sook	6
(United States) Emily Cross	7
(Japan) Chieko Sugawara	15
(Italy) Margherita Granbassi	6
(Germany) Carolin Golubytskyi	5
(Netherlands) Djinn Geurts	8
(Hungary) Edina Knapek	13

Round of 16
(South Korea) Nam Hyun-Hee	15
(Japan) Chieko Sugawara	8
(Italy) Margherita Granbassi	13
(Hungary) Edina Knapek	11

Quarterfinals
(South Korea) Nam Hyun-Hee	9
(Italy) Margherita Granbassi	10

==== Section 4 ====
Round of 64
(France) Adeline Wuilleme	15
(Venezuela) Mariana González	5
(Japan) Maki Kawanishi	13
(United States) Hanna Thompson	14
(Germany) Katja Waechter	9
(Ukraine) Tetyana Savchenko	8
(United States) Iris Zimmermann	4
(Italy) Giovanna Trillini	12
(France) Celine Seigneur	9
(Netherlands) Indra Angad-Gaur	15
(Japan) Maki Isomoto	4
(Russia) Aida Chanaeva	15
(South Korea) Seo Mi-jung	12
(Ukraine) Olena Khishmatulina	9
(Venezuela) Johana Fuenmayor	7
(Germany) Anja Müller	15

Round of 32
(France) Adeline Wuilleme	15
(United States) Hanna Thompson	8
(Germany) Katja Waechter	8
(Italy) Giovanna Trillini	15
(Netherlands) Indra Angad-Gaur	8
(Russia) Aida Chanaeva	15
(South Korea) Seo Mi-jung	5
(Germany) Anja Müller	7

Round of 16
(France) Adeline Wuilleme	12
(Italy) Giovanna Trillini	15
(Russia) Aida Chanaeva	11
(Germany) Anja Müller	10

Quarterfinals
(Italy) Giovanna Trillini	15
(Russia) Aida Chanaeva	4
