= Women's foil at the 2007 World Fencing Championships =

- Venue: SCC Peterburgsky
- Location: Saint Petersburg, Russia
- Dates: 4 October

Medalists
gold medal	Valentina Vezzali	Italy
silver medal	Margherita Granbassi	Italy
bronze medal	Giovanna Trillini	Italy
bronze medal	Aida Mohamed	Hungary

The Women's foil event took place on October 4, 2007 at SCC Peterburgsky.

== Draw ==
=== Finals ===
Quarter-finals
(Italy) Margherita Granbassi	15
(Hungary) Virginie Ujlaky	10
(Hungary) Edina Knapek	9
(Hungary) Aida Mohamed	10
(Italy) Valentina Vezzali	15
(Italy) Ilaria Salvatori	7
(Italy) Giovanna Trillini	15
(South Korea) Nam Hyun-Hee	4

Semi-finals
(Italy) Margherita Granbassi	14
(Hungary) Aida Mohamed	13
(Italy) Valentina Vezzali	15
(Italy) Giovanna Trillini	6

Final
(Italy) Margherita Granbassi	8
(Italy) Valentina Vezzali	11

=== Top half ===
==== Section 1 ====
Round of 64
(Italy) Margherita Granbassi	14
(United Kingdom) Martina Emanuel	7
(China) Su Wanwen	5
(France) Celine Seigneur	4
(France) Corinne Maîtrejean	14
(Netherlands) Indra Angad-Gaur	15
(Poland) Katarzyna Kryczalo	7
(Japan) Chieko Sugawara	15
(Russia) Ianna Rouzavina	14
(Netherlands) Djinn Geurts	8
(Austria) Anna Docker	8
(Japan) Yoko Makishita	15
(Germany) Katja Waechter	8
(Hungary) Virginie Ujlaky	15
(Canada) Monica Kwan	10
(Germany) Carolin Golubytskyi	15

Round of 32
(Italy) Margherita Granbassi	7
(China) Su Wanwen	6
(Netherlands) Indra Angad-Gaur	5
(Japan) Chieko Sugawara	4
(Russia) Ianna Rouzavina	9
(Japan) Yoko Makishita	8
(Hungary) Virginie Ujlaky	15
(Germany) Carolin Golubytskyi	8

Round of 16
(Italy) Margherita Granbassi	12
(Netherlands) Indra Angad-Gaur	8
(Russia) Ianna Rouzavina	10
(Hungary) Virginie Ujlaky	15

Quarterfinals
(Italy) Margherita Granbassi	15
(Hungary) Virginie Ujlaky	10

==== Section 2 ====
Round of 64
(Romania) Cristina Stahl	15
(Venezuela) Marianny Rincones	6
(China) Huang Jialing	8
(Poland) Magdalena Mroczkiewicz	15
(South Korea) Lee Hye Sun	7
(Russia) Aida Chanaeva	6
(Austria) Barbara Koppenwallner	11
(Hungary) Edina Knapek	15
(Hungary) Gabriella Varga	15
(Netherlands) Saskia Garcia	3
(Australia) Joanna Halls	7
(United States) Hanna Thompson	15
(Romania) Daniela Tanase	12
(Cuba) Misleydis Compañy	15
(Ukraine) Tetyana Savchenko	6
(Hungary) Aida Mohamed	15

Round of 32
(Romania) Cristina Stahl	9
(Poland) Magdalena Mroczkiewicz	5
(South Korea) Lee Hye Sun	9
(Hungary) Edina Knapek	15
(Hungary) Gabriella Varga	13
(United States) Hanna Thompson	5
(Cuba) Misleydis Compañy	9
(Hungary) Aida Mohamed	15

Round of 16
(Romania) Cristina Stahl	6
(Hungary) Edina Knapek	7
(Hungary) Gabriella Varga	3
(Hungary) Aida Mohamed	15

Quarterfinals
(Hungary) Edina Knapek	9
(Hungary) Aida Mohamed	10

=== Bottom half ===
==== Section 3 ====
Round of 64
(Italy) Valentina Vezzali	15
(Venezuela) Yulitza Suarez	4
(United States) Erinn Smart	10
(France) Melanie Moumas	15
(France) Adeline Wuilleme	15
(Ukraine) Olha Leleiko	9
(Argentina) Alejandra Carbone	14
(Germany) Anja Schache	15
(United States) Emily Cross	15
(Canada) Jujie Luan	10
(South Korea) Seo Mi-jung	8
(Poland) Sylwia Gruchała	15
(Venezuela) Mariana González	8
(Russia) Olga Lobyntseva	15
(Romania) Cristina Ghita	5
(Italy) Ilaria Salvatori	13

Round of 32
(Italy) Valentina Vezzali	14
(France) Melanie Moumas	5
(France) Adeline Wuilleme	9
(Germany) Anja Schache	15
(United States) Emily Cross	15
(Poland) Sylwia Gruchała	7
(Russia) Olga Lobyntseva	8
(Italy) Ilaria Salvatori	15

Round of 16
(Italy) Valentina Vezzali	15
(Germany) Anja Schache	6
(United States) Emily Cross	7
(Italy) Ilaria Salvatori	15

Quarterfinals
(Italy) Valentina Vezzali	15
(Italy) Ilaria Salvatori	7

==== Section 4 ====
Round of 64
(Italy) Giovanna Trillini	11
(Romania) Roxana Scarlat	10
(Ukraine) Olena Khishmatulina	5
(China) Zhang Lei	13
(South Korea) Jung Gil-ok	2
(Japan) Kanae Ikehata	15
(United States) Iris Zimmermann	4
(Russia) Evgenia Lamonova	10
(Israel) Delila Hatuel	11
(Poland) Małgorzata Wojtkowiak	10
(Japan) Maki Kawanishi	13
(Austria) Sandra Kleinberger	4
(Germany) Sandra Bingenheimer	6
(China) Sun Chao	15
(Slovakia) Gyongy Hanzelova	7
(South Korea) Nam Hyun-Hee	15

Round of 32
(Italy) Giovanna Trillini	6
(China) Zhang Lei	5
(Japan) Kanae Ikehata	2
(Russia) Evgenia Lamonova	9
(Israel) Delila Hatuel	7
(Japan) Maki Kawanishi	4
(China) Sun Chao	9
(South Korea) Nam Hyun-Hee	15

Round of 16
(Italy) Giovanna Trillini	9
(Russia) Evgenia Lamonova	8
(Israel) Delila Hatuel	11
(South Korea) Nam Hyun-Hee	12

Quarterfinals
(Italy) Giovanna Trillini	15
(South Korea) Nam Hyun-Hee	4
