= Women's foil at the 2009 World Fencing Championships =

- Venue: Antalya Expo Center
- Location: Antalya, Turkey
- Dates: 4 October

Medalists
gold medal	Aida Shanayeva	Russia
silver medal	Jeon Hee-sook	South Korea
bronze medal	Elisa Di Francisca	Italy
bronze medal	Arianna Errigo	Italy

The Women's foil event took place on October 4, 2009 at Antalya Expo Center.

== Draw ==
=== Finals ===
Quarter-finals
(Russia) Larisa Korobeynikova	4
(South Korea) Jeon Hee-Sook	15
(France) Astrid Guyart	10
(Italy) Arianna Errigo	15
(Russia) Aida Shanaeva	15
(Russia) Yulia Biryukova	4
(Italy) Elisa di Francisca	15
(Italy) Valentina Vezzali	10

Semi-finals
(South Korea) Jeon Hee-Sook	15
(Italy) Arianna Errigo	11
(Russia) Aida Shanaeva	15
(Italy) Elisa di Francisca	6

Final
(South Korea) Jeon Hee-Sook	11
(Russia) Aida Shanaeva	12

=== Top half ===
==== Section 1 ====
Round of 64
(South Korea) Nam Hyun-Hee	15
(Kazakhstan) Yelena Kazantseva	4
(Poland) Katarzyna Kryczalo	15
(Hong Kong) Po Heung Lin	5
(Russia) Larisa Korobeynikova	15
(United Kingdom) Anna Bentley	6
(Romania) Andreea Andrei	13
(Tunisia) Ines Boubakri	15
(South Korea) Jeon Hee-Sook	15
(Canada) Annie-Claude Therrien	4
(Hungary) Adrienn Berta	3
(United States) Nzingha Prescod	15
(Ukraine) Olena Khishmatulina	15
(Japan) Michiko Ichikawa	11
(Turkey) Cansu Tor	2
(Germany) Carolin Golubytskyi	15

Round of 32
(South Korea) Nam Hyun-Hee	15
(Poland) Katarzyna Kryczalo	7
(Russia) Larisa Korobeynikova	15
(Tunisia) Ines Boubakri	8
(South Korea) Jeon Hee-Sook	14
(United States) Nzingha Prescod	7
(Ukraine) Olena Khishmatulina	6
(Germany) Carolin Golubytskyi	15

Round of 16
(South Korea) Nam Hyun-Hee	8
(Russia) Larisa Korobeynikova	9
(South Korea) Jeon Hee-Sook	15
(Germany) Carolin Golubytskyi	5

Quarterfinals
(Russia) Larisa Korobeynikova	4
(South Korea) Jeon Hee-Sook	15

==== Section 2 ====
Round of 64
(Poland) Sylwia Gruchała	15
(Canada) Shannon Comerford	4
(China) Chen Jinyan	14
(United States) Lee Kiefer	12
(France) Astrid Guyart	15
(Brazil) Christine Botros	1
(Romania) Cristina Ghita	9
(France) Corinne Maîtrejean	15
(Germany) Anja Schache	15
(Canada) Kelleigh Ryan	4
(Canada) Monica Kwan	3
(Austria) Sandra Kleinberger	15
(France) Melanie Moumas	15
(Israel) Delila Hatuel	5
(Poland) Małgorzata Wojtkowiak	13
(Italy) Arianna Errigo	15

Round of 32
(Poland) Sylwia Gruchała	15
(China) Chen Jinyan	14
(France) Astrid Guyart	15
(France) Corinne Maîtrejean	9
(Germany) Anja Schache	15
(Austria) Sandra Kleinberger	7
(France) Melanie Moumas	6
(Italy) Arianna Errigo	15

Round of 16
(Poland) Sylwia Gruchała	11
(France) Astrid Guyart	15
(Germany) Anja Schache	13
(Italy) Arianna Errigo	15

Quarterfinals
(France) Astrid Guyart	10
(Italy) Arianna Errigo	15

=== Bottom half ===
==== Section 3 ====
Round of 64
(Italy) Margherita Granbassi	13
(United States) Doris Willette	8
(Hungary) Katalin Varga	3
(South Korea) Jung Gil-ok	15
(United States) Ambika Singh	12
(United Kingdom) Claire Bennett	11
(Brazil) Tais Rochel	5
(Russia) Aida Shanaeva	15
(Russia) Yuliya Biryukova	14
(Japan) Shiho Nishioka	6
(Hungary) Fanny Kreiss	7
(China) Su Wanwen	15
(Japan) Kanae Ikehata	6
(Romania) Cristina Sthal	5
(Mexico) Nataly Michel	5
(Germany) Katja Waechter	15

Round of 32
(Italy) Margherita Granbassi	13
(South Korea) Jung Gil-ok	15
(United States) Ambika Singh	9
(Russia) Aida Shanaeva	15
(Russia) Yuliya Biryukova	14
(China) Su Wanwen	8
(Japan) Kanae Ikehata	9
(Germany) Katja Waechter	15

Round of 16
(South Korea) Jung Gil-ok	12
(Russia) Aida Shanaeva	13
(Russia) Yuliya Biryukova	15
(Germany) Katja Waechter	14

Quarterfinals
(Russia) Aida Shanaeva	15
(Russia) Yuliya Biryukova	4

==== Section 4 ====
Round of 64
(Hungary) Gabriella Varga	15
(Turkey) Merve Karamete	5
(Ukraine) Kateryna Chentsova	7
(Poland) Karolin Chlewinska	15
(South Korea) Seo Mi-jung	15
(France) Virginie Ujlaky	8
(Japan) Yuki Mori	1
(Italy) Elisa Di Francisca	15
(Russia) Kamilla Gafurzianova	15
(China) Yun Shi	8
(United Kingdom) Martina Emanuel	14
(China) Huili Dai	15
(Ukraine) Olha Leleiko	14
(Venezuela) Mariana González	15
(Germany) Maria Bartkowski	0
(Italy) Valentina Vezzali	15

Round of 32
(Hungary) Gabriella Varga	15
(Poland) Karolin Chlewinska	11
(South Korea) Seo Mi-jung	9
(Italy) Elisa Di Francisca	15
(Russia) Kamilla Gafurzianova	15
(China) Huili Dai	6
(Venezuela) Mariana González	3
(Italy) Valentina Vezzali	15

Round of 16
(Hungary) Gabriella Varga	6
(Italy) Elisa Di Francisca	15
(Russia) Kamilla Gafurzianova	6
(Italy) Valentina Vezzali	15

Quarterfinals
(Italy) Elisa Di Francisca	15
(Italy) Valentina Vezzali	10
