= Women's foil at the 2011 World Fencing Championships =

- Venue: Palaghiaccio Città di Catania
- Location: Catania, Italy
- Dates: 11 October

Medalists
gold medal	Valentina Vezzali	Italy
silver medal	Elisa Di Francisca	Italy
bronze medal	Nam Hyun-hee	South Korea
bronze medal	Lee Kiefer	United States

The Women's foil event of the 2011 World Fencing Championships took place on October 11, 2011.

== Draw ==
=== Finals ===
Semi-finals
(Italy) Valentina Vezzali	15
(United States) Lee Kiefer	10
(South Korea) Nam Hyun-hee	8
(Italy) Elisa Di Francisca	14

Final
(Italy) Valentina Vezzali	14
(Italy) Elisa Di Francisca	7

=== Top half ===
==== Section 1 ====
Round of 64
(Italy) Valentina Vezzali	15
(United Kingdom) Sophie Troiano	3
(South Korea) Jung Gil-ok	9
(Russia) Larisa Korobeynikova	8
(Germany) Carolin Golubytskyi	5
(Hungary) Fanny Kreiss	4
(Japan) Chie Yoshizawa	3
(United States) Nzingha Prescod	15
(Hungary) Aida Mohamed	15
(China) Sun Chao	6
(Germany) Sandra Bingenheimer	15
(Belgium) Julie Groslambert	6
(Brazil) Taís Rochel	7
(Poland) Małgorzata Wojtkowiak	15
(Egypt) Shaimaa El Gammal	6
(France) Corinne Maîtrejean	15

Round of 32
(Italy) Valentina Vezzali	13
(South Korea) Jung Gil-ok	5
(Germany) Carolin Golubytskyi	15
(United States) Nzingha Prescod	9
(Hungary) Aida Mohamed	15
(Germany) Sandra Bingenheimer	12
(Poland) Małgorzata Wojtkowiak	9
(France) Corinne Maîtrejean	15

Round of 16
(Italy) Valentina Vezzali	15
(Germany) Carolin Golubytskyi	8
(Hungary) Aida Mohamed	13
(France) Corinne Maîtrejean	15

Quarterfinals
(Italy) Valentina Vezzali	12
(France) Corinne Maîtrejean	11

==== Section 2 ====
Round of 64
(Russia) Aida Shanayeva	15
(Portugal) Débora Nogueira	2
(France) Gaëlle Gebet	14
(Poland) Martyna Synoradzka	15
(Canada) Kelleigh Ryan	14
(Hungary) Edina Knapek	13
(United Kingdom) Martina Emanuel	13
(Tunisia) Inès Boubakri	15
(United States) Lee Kiefer	15
(United States) Doris Willette	10
(Germany) Anja Schache	15
(Egypt) Iman Shaban	3
(China) Chen Jinyan	15
(United Kingdom) Natalia Sheppard	8
(France) Virginie Ujlaky	15
(Italy) Arianna Errigo	13

Round of 32
(Russia) Aida Shanayeva	13
(Poland) Martyna Synoradzka	15
(Canada) Kelleigh Ryan	4
(Tunisia) Inès Boubakri	15
(United States) Lee Kiefer	15
(Germany) Anja Schache	8
(China) Chen Jinyan	15
(France) Virginie Ujlaky	10

Round of 16
(Poland) Martyna Synoradzka	15
(Tunisia) Inès Boubakri	10
(United States) Lee Kiefer	15
(China) Chen Jinyan	10

Quarterfinals
(Poland) Martyna Synoradzka	12
(United States) Lee Kiefer	15

=== Bottom half ===
==== Section 3 ====
Round of 64
(South Korea) Nam Hyun-hee	15
(Ukraine) Anastasiya Moskovska	5
(Hungary) Gabriella Varga	10
(Poland) Anna Rybicka	15
(South Korea) Lee Hye-sun	9
(Vietnam) Nguyen Thi Tuoi	8
(Japan) Kyomi Hirata	3
(Russia) Inna Deriglazova	15
(Poland) Sylwia Gruchała	15
(Ukraine) Olga Leleyko	11
(Hong Kong) Lin Po Heung	9
(United States) Nicole Ross	14
(Colombia) Saskia Garcia	15
(Canada) Monica Peterson	10
(Venezuela) Mariana González	11
(Italy) Ilaria Salvatori	15

Round of 32
(South Korea) Nam Hyun-hee	15
(Poland) Anna Rybicka	13
(South Korea) Lee Hye-sun	9
(Russia) Inna Deriglazova	12
(Poland) Sylwia Gruchała	9
(United States) Nicole Ross	15
(Colombia) Saskia Garcia	5
(Italy) Ilaria Salvatori	15

Round of 16
(South Korea) Nam Hyun-hee	12
(Russia) Inna Deriglazova	10
(United States) Nicole Ross	7
(Italy) Ilaria Salvatori	15

Quarterfinals
(South Korea) Nam Hyun-hee	15
(Italy) Ilaria Salvatori	8

==== Section 4 ====
Round of 64
(Russia) Yevgeniya Lamonova	15
(Mexico) Nataly Michel	3
(Ukraine) Kateryna Chentsova	15
(China) Le Huilin	13
(Lebanon) Mona Shaito	9
(Japan) Chieko Sugawara	15
(Venezuela) Johana Choles	5
(South Korea) Jeon Hee-sook	7
(France) Astrid Guyart	15
(Austria) Sandra Kleinberger	7
(China) Liu Yongshi	15
(Canada) Alanna Goldie	12
(Germany) Katja Wächter	15
(New Zealand) Ping Yuan	6
(Greece) Chrissoula Kontareli	0
(Italy) Elisa Di Francisca	15

Round of 32
(Russia) Yevgeniya Lamonova	11
(Ukraine) Kateryna Chentsova	10
(Japan) Chieko Sugawara	9
(South Korea) Jeon Hee-sook	13
(France) Astrid Guyart	6
(China) Liu Yongshi	15
(Germany) Katja Wächter	7
(Italy) Elisa Di Francisca	15

Round of 16
(Russia) Yevgeniya Lamonova	11
(South Korea) Jeon Hee-sook	6
(China) Liu Yongshi	7
(Italy) Elisa Di Francisca	15

Quarterfinals
(Russia) Yevgeniya Lamonova	7
(Italy) Elisa Di Francisca	15
