= Fencing at the 2008 Summer Olympics – Women's foil =

Women's foil at the Games of the XXIX Olympiad
- Venue: Olympic Green Convention Centre
- Date: 11 August 2008
- Competitors: 41 from 24 nations

Medalists
| 1st place, gold medalist(s) | | Valentina Vezzali | Italy |
| 2nd place, silver medalist(s) | | Nam Hyun-Hee | South Korea |
| 3rd place, bronze medalist(s) | | Margherita Granbassi | Italy |

The women's foil fencing competition at the 2008 Summer Olympics in Beijing took place on August 11 at the Olympic Green Convention Centre.

The foil competition consisted of a six-round single-elimination bracket with a bronze medal match between the two semifinal losers. Fencing was done to 15 touches or to the completion of three three-minute rounds if neither fencer reached 15 touches by then. At the end of time, the higher-scoring fencer was the winner; a tie resulted in an additional one-minute sudden-death time period. This sudden-death period was further modified by the selection of a draw-winner beforehand; if neither fencer scored a touch during the minute, the predetermined draw-winner won the bout.

== Bracket ==
=== Finals ===
Semifinals
Giovanna Trillini (ITA) | 10
Nam Hyun-Hee (KOR) | 15
Margherita Granbassi (ITA) | 3
Valentina Vezzali (ITA) | 12

Final
Nam Hyun-Hee (KOR) | 5
Valentina Vezzali (ITA) | 6
Bronze medal match
Giovanna Trillini (ITA) | 12
Margherita Granbassi (ITA) | 15

=== Section 1 ===
Round of 64
33 | Misleydis Compañy (CUB) | 15
32 | Joanna Halls (AUS) | 13
41 | María Luisa Doig (PER) | 4
24 | Katja Wächter (GER) | 15
25 | Erinn Smart (USA) | 15
40 | Martina Emanuel (GBR) | 7

Round of 32
1 | Giovanna Trillini (ITA) | 15
33 | Misleydis Compañy (CUB) | 7
17 | Sylwia Gruchała (POL) | 11
16 | Aida Chanaeva (RUS) | 12
9 | Cristina Stahl (ROU) | 6
24 | Katja Wächter (GER) | 15
25 | Erinn Smart (USA) | 9
8 | Corinne Maîtrejean (FRA) | 15

Round of 16
1 | Giovanna Trillini (ITA) | 15
16 | Aida Chanaeva (RUS) | 3
24 | Katja Wächter (GER) | 15
8 | Corinne Maîtrejean (FRA) | 10

Quarterfinals
1 | Giovanna Trillini (ITA) | 15
24 | Katja Wächter (GER) | 8

=== Section 2 ===
Round of 64
37 | Anissa Khelfaoui (ALG) | 2
28 | Hanna Thompson (USA) | 11
29 | Shaimaa El Gammal (EGY) | 12
36 | Iman Shaban (EGY) | 15

Round of 32
5 | Carolin Golubytskyi (GER) | 13
28 | Hanna Thompson (USA) | 5
21 | Jung Gil-Ok (KOR) | 9
12 | Chieko Sugawara (JPN) | 11
13 | Gabriella Varga (HUN) | 15
20 | Mariana González (VEN) | 2
36 | Iman Shaban (EGY) | 6
4 | Nam Hyun-Hee (KOR) | 15

Round of 16
5 | Carolin Golubytskyi (GER) | 5
12 | Chieko Sugawara (JPN) | 6
13 | Gabriella Varga (HUN) | 4
4 | Nam Hyun-Hee (KOR) | 15

Quarterfinals
12 | Chieko Sugawara (JPN) | 10
4 | Nam Hyun-Hee (KOR) | 15

=== Section 3 ===
Round of 64
35 | Eman El Gammal (EGY) | 4
30 | Indra Angad-Gaur (NED) | 13
27 | Ines Boubakri (TUN) | 9
38 | Jujie Luan (CAN) | 13

Round of 32
3 | Margherita Granbassi (ITA) | 11
30 | Indra Angad-Gaur (NED) | 6
19 | Victoria Nikichina (RUS) | 10
14 | Delila Hatuel (ISR) | 9
11 | Evgenia Lamonova (RUS) | 15
22 | Anja Schache (GER) | 2
38 | Jujie Luan (CAN) | 7
6 | Aida Mohamed (HUN) | 15

Round of 16
3 | Margherita Granbassi (ITA) | 11
19 | Victoria Nikichina (RUS) | 4
11 | Evgenia Lamonova (RUS) | 15
6 | Aida Mohamed (HUN) | 5

Quarterfinals
3 | Margherita Granbassi (ITA) | 12
11 | Evgenia Lamonova (RUS) | 7

=== Section 4 ===
Round of 64
39 | Debora Nogueira (POR) | 4
26 | Su Wanwen (CHN) | 15
31 | Magdalena Mroczkiewicz (POL) | 15
34 | Olha Leleyko (UKR) | 9

Round of 32
7 | Emily Cross (USA) | 7
26 | Su Wanwen (CHN) | 15
23 | Sun Chao (CHN) | 13
10 | Edina Knapek (HUN) | 15
15 | Zhang Lei (CHN) | 15
18 | Malgorzata Wojtkowiak (POL) | 8
31 | Magdalena Mroczkiewicz (POL) | 3
2 | Valentina Vezzali (ITA) | 15

Round of 16
26 | Su Wanwen (CHN) | 10
10 | Edina Knapek (HUN) | 15
15 | Zhang Lei (CHN) | 7
2 | Valentina Vezzali (ITA) | 10

Quarterfinals
10 | Edina Knapek (HUN) | 3
2 | Valentina Vezzali (ITA) | 15

== Final classification ==
| Rank | Athlete | Nation |
|---|---|---|
| 1st place, gold medalist(s) | Valentina Vezzali | Italy |
| 2nd place, silver medalist(s) | Hyun-Hee Nam | South Korea |
| 3rd place, bronze medalist(s) | Margherita Granbassi | Italy |
| 4 | Giovanna Trillini | Italy |
| 5 | Edina Knapek | Hungary |
| 6 | Yevgeniya Lamonova | Russia |
| 7 | Chieko Sugawara | Japan |
| 8 | Katja Wächter | Germany |
| 9 | Carolin Golubytskyi | Germany |
| 10 | Aida Mohamed | Hungary |
| 11 | Corinne Maîtrejean | France |
| 12 | Gabriella Varga | Hungary |
| 13 | Lei Zhang | China |
| 14 | Aida Shanayeva | Russia |
| 15 | Viktoria Nikishina | Russia |
| 16 | Wanwen Su | China |
| 17 | Emily Cross | United States |
| 18 | Cristina Stahl | Romania |
| 19 | Delila Hatuel | Israel |
| 20 | Sylwia Gruchała | Poland |
| 21 | Małgorzata Wojtkowiak | Poland |
| 22 | Mariana González | Venezuela |
| 23 | Anja Schache | Germany |
| 24 | Gil-Ok Jung | South Korea |
| 25 | Chao Sun | China |
| 26 | Erinn Smart | United States |
| 27 | Hanna Thompson | United States |
| 28 | Indra Angad-Gaur | Netherlands |
| 29 | Magdalena Mroczkiewicz | Poland |
| 30 | Misleydis Compañy | Cuba |
| 31 | Iman Shaban | Egypt |
| 32 | Jujie Luan | Canada |
| 33 | Inès Boubakri | Tunisia |
| 34 | Shaimaa El-Gammal | Egypt |
| 35 | Joanna Halls | Australia |
| 36 | Olha Leleiko | Ukraine |
| 37 | Eman El Gammal | Egypt |
| 38 | Anissa Khelfaoui | Algeria |
| 39 | Martina Emanuel | Great Britain |
| 40 | Débora Nogueira | Portugal |
| 41 | María Luisa Doig | Peru |
