= Fencing at the 2008 Summer Olympics – Women's team foil =

Women's team foil at the Games of the XXIX Olympiad
- Venue: Olympic Green Convention Centre
- Date: 16 August 2008
- Competitors: 29 from 8 nations

Medalists
1st place, gold medalist(s)		Svetlana Boyko; Aida Chanaeva; Victoria Nikichina; Evgenia Lamonova	Russia
2nd place, silver medalist(s)		Emily Cross; Erinn Smart; Hanna Thompson	United States
3rd place, bronze medalist(s)		Margherita Granbassi; Ilaria Salvatori; Giovanna Trillini; Valentina Vezzali	Italy

The women's team foil fencing competition at the 2008 Summer Olympics in Beijing took place on August 16 at the Olympic Green Convention Centre.

The team foil competition consisted of a three-round single-elimination bracket with a bronze medal match between the two semifinal losers and classification semifinals and finals for 5th to 8th places. Teams consist of three members each. Matches consist of nine bouts, with every fencer on one team facing each fencer on the other team. Scoring carried over between bouts with a total of 45 touches being the team goal. Bouts lasted until one team reached the target multiple of 5 touches. For example, if the first bout ended with a score of 5–3, that score would remain into the next bout and the second bout would last until one team reached 10 touches. Bouts also had a maximum time of three minutes each; if the final bout ended before either team reached 45 touches, the team leading at that point won. A tie at that point would result in an additional one-minute sudden-death time period. This sudden-death period was further modified by the selection of a draw-winner beforehand; if neither fencer scored a touch during the minute, the predetermined draw-winner won the bout.

== Draw ==
=== Finals ===
Quarterfinals
1	Russia	45
8	Egypt	23
5	China	24
4	Italy	37
3	Hungary	35
6	Germany	31
7	United States	31
2	Poland	30

Semifinals
1	Russia	22
4	Italy	21
3	Hungary	33
7	United States	35

Finals
1	Russia	28
7	United States	11
Third place
4	Italy	32
3	Hungary	23

=== Classification 5- 8 ===
Placement 5-8
8	Egypt	24
5	China	45
6	Germany	32
2	Poland	27

Placement 5-6
5	China	28
6	Germany	34
Placement 7-8
8	Egypt	14
2	Poland	45

== Final classification ==
Rank	Team	Athlete
1st place, gold medalist(s)	Russia	Svetlana Boyko; Aida Chanaeva; Victoria Nikichina; Evgenia Lamonova
2nd place, silver medalist(s)	United States	Emily Cross; Hanna Thompson; Erinn Smart
3rd place, bronze medalist(s)	Italy	Valentina Vezzali; Giovanna Trillini; Margherita Granbassi; Ilaria Salvatori
4	Hungary	Gabriella Varga; Edina Knapek; Aida Mohamed; Virginie Ujlaki
5	Germany	Carolin Golubytskyi; Anja Schache; Katja Waechter
6	China	Huang Jialing; Sun Chao; Zhang Lei; Su Wanwen
7	Poland	Malgorzata Wojtkowiak; Magdalena Mroczkiewicz; Sylwia Gruchała; Karolina Chlewinska
8	Egypt	Iman Shaban; Iman El Gammal; Shaimaa El Gammal
