= 2004–05 Fencing World Cup =

International fencing competition

The 34th FIE Fencing World Cup began in October 2004 and concluded in October 2005 at the 2005 World Fencing Championships in Leipzig, Germany.

== Individual Épée ==
Men
1	Fabrice Jeannet (FRA)	206
2	Jérôme Jeannet (FRA)	190
3	Stefano Carozzo (ITA)	180
4	Christoph Marik (AUT)	168
5	Bas Verwijlen (NED)	158
6	Daniel Strigel (GER)	148
7	Alessandro Bossalini (ITA)	134
8	Pavel Kolobkov (RUS)	132
9	Claus Mørch (NOR)	132
10	Sven Schmid (GER)	126

Women
1	Imke Duplitzer (GER)	266
2	Laura Flessel-Colovic (FRA)	228
3	Danuta Dmowska (POL)	200
4	Anna Sivkova (RUS)	192
5	Sherraine Schalm (CAN)	188
6	Cristiana Cascioli (ITA)	182
7	Hajnalka Kiraly (FRA)	174
8	Ana Maria Brânză (ROU)	132
9	Sarah Daninthe (FRA)	132
10	Britta Heidemann (GER)	126

== Individual Foil ==
Men
1	Salvatore Sanzo (ITA)	282
2	Erwann Le Péchoux (FRA)	272
3	Zhang Liangliang (CHN)	226
4	Ralf Bißdorf (GER)	186
5	Andrea Baldini (ITA)	182
6	Nicolas Beaudan (FRA)	180
7	Andrea Cassarà (ITA)	158
8	Simone Vanni (ITA)	152
9	Benjamin Kleibrink (GER)	152
10	Peter Joppich (GER)	146

Women
1	Anja Schache (GER)	226
2	Margherita Granbassi (ITA)	202
3	Edina Knapek (HUN)	192
4	Seo Mi-jung (KOR)	190
5	Svetlana Boyko (RUS)	176
6	Elisa Di Francisca (ITA)	174
7	Aida Mohamed (HUN)	168
8	Corinne Maîtrejean (FRA)	166
9	Adeline Wuillème (FRA)	166
10	Chieko Sugawara (JPN)	164

== Individual Sabre ==
Men
1	Aleksey Yakimenko (RUS)	280
2	Mihai Covaliu (ROU)	232
3	Dmitry Lapkes (BLR)	228
4	Nicolas Limbach (GER)	214
5	Zsolt Nemcsik (HUN)	190
6	Aldo Montano (ITA)	184
7	Boris Sanson (FRA)	180
8	Volodymyr Lukashenko (UKR)	170
9	Vincent Anstett (FRA)	160
10	Julien Pillet (FRA)	138

Women
1	Anne-Lise Touya (FRA)	270
2	Sada Jacobson (USA)	252
3	Aleksandra Socha (POL)	228
4	Alessandra Lucchino (ITA)	198
5	Mariel Zagunis (USA)	182
6	Sofiya Velikaya (RUS)	180
7	Gioia Marzocca (ITA)	168
8	Yelena Nechayeva (RUS)	162
9	Zhao Yuanyuan (CHN)	144
10	Svetlana Kormilitsyna (RUS)	142

== Team Épée ==
Men
1	France	348
2	Germany	312
3	Italy	233
4	Ukraine	220
5	Hungary	206
6	Poland	189
7	Russia	169
8	Spain	157
9	Sweden	142
10	Austria	141

Women
1	Germany	272
2	France	270
3	Russia	268
4	Hungary	232
5	Ukraine	206
6	Canada	187
7	Poland	170
8	China	163
9	Estonia	157
10	Italy	156

== Team Foil ==
Men
1	France	356
2	Germany	272
3	Italy	272
4	China	226
5	Poland	208
6	United States	196
7	Russia	196
8	Austria	171
9	Belgium	158
10	Spain	155

Women
1	South Korea	282
2	Russia	274
3	Hungary	248
4	France	238
5	Poland	230
6	Germany	214
7	Italy	204
8	China	130
9	Japan	130
10	Romania	129

== Team Sabre ==
Men
1	Italy	324
2	Russia	277
3	France	268
4	Ukraine	217
5	Germany	214
6	United States	205
7	Belarus	200
8	Spain	167
9	Romania	166
10	Hungary	142

Women
1	Russia	328
2	Poland	218
3	Italy	216
4	France	214
5	China	189
6	Hungary	174
7	United States	168
8	Ukraine	139
9	Germany	124
10	Great Britain	118
