= Elisa Di Francisca =

Italian fencer (born 1982)

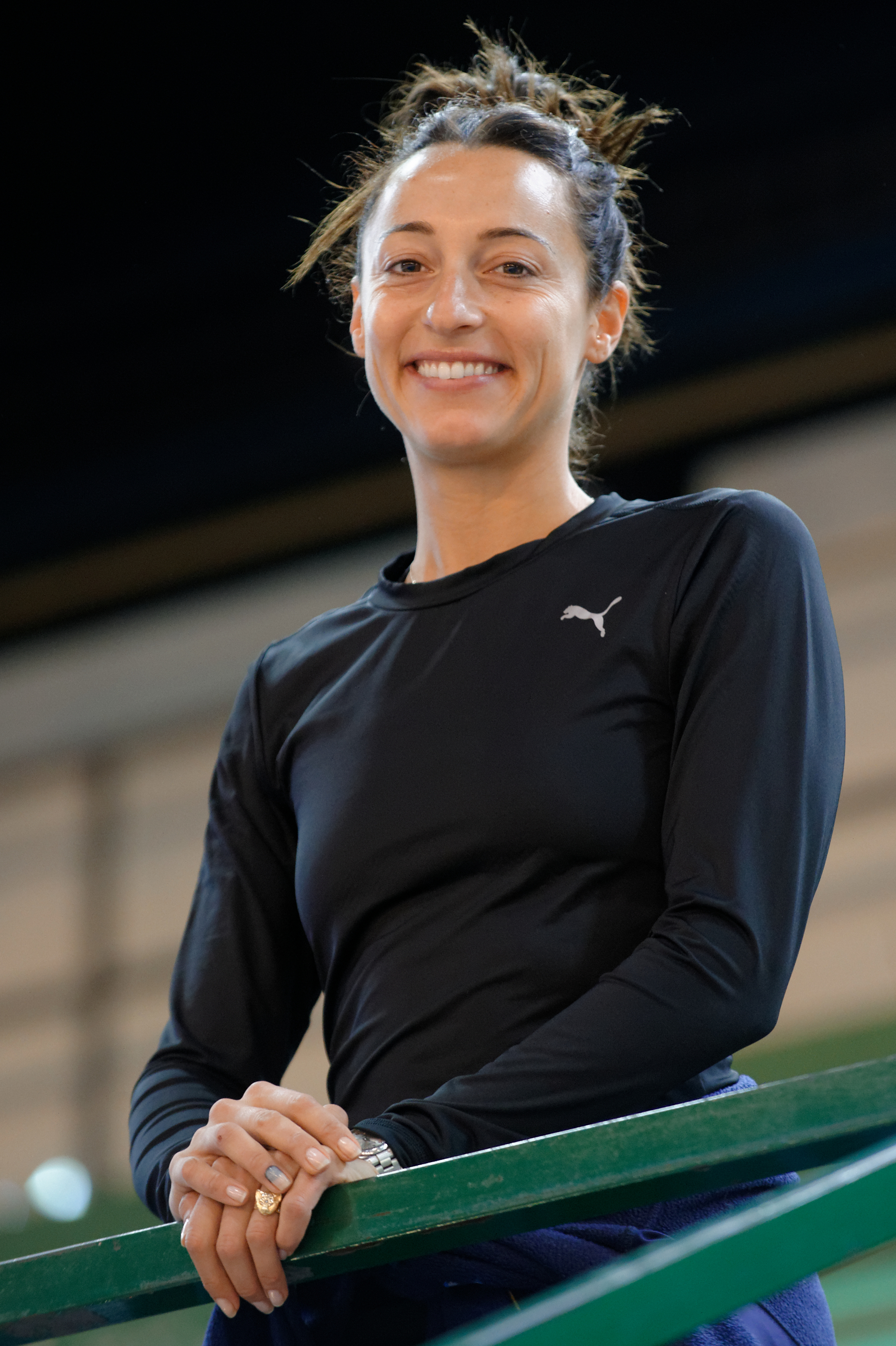
- Di Francisca in 2014

Personal information
- Full name: Veronica Rossella Elisa Di Francisca
- Born: 13 December 1982 (age 43) Jesi, Italy
- Height: 1.77 m (5 ft 10 in)
- Weight: 65 kg (143 lb)

Fencing career
- Sport: Fencing
- Country: Italy
- Weapon: Foil
- Hand: Right-handed
- National coach: Andrea Cipressa
- Club: G.S. Fiamme Oro
- Head coach: Giovanna Trillini
- Former coach: Stefano Cerioni
- FIE ranking: current ranking
Medal record
Event	1st	2nd	3rd
Olympic Games	2	1	0
World Championships	7	5	3
European Championships	13	2	3
World Cup (ind.)	9	10	10
Total	31	18	16
Olympic Games
Gold medal – first place	2012 London	Individual foil
Gold medal – first place	2012 London	Team foil
Silver medal – second place	2016 Rio de Janeiro	Individual foil
World Championships
Gold medal – first place	2004 New York	Team foil
Gold medal – first place	2009 Antalya	Team foil
Gold medal – first place	2010 Paris	Individual foil
Gold medal – first place	2010 Paris	Team foil
Gold medal – first place	2013 Budapest	Team foil
Gold medal – first place	2014 Kazan	Team foil
Gold medal – first place	2015 Moscow	Team foil
Silver medal – second place	2006 Turin	Team foil
Silver medal – second place	2011 Catania	Individual foil
Silver medal – second place	2011 Catania	Team foil
Silver medal – second place	2016 Rio de Janeiro	Team foil
Silver medal – second place	2019 Budapest	Team foil
Bronze medal – third place	2009 Antalya	Individual foil
Bronze medal – third place	2013 Budapest	Individual foil
Bronze medal – third place	2019 Budapest	Individual foil
European Championships
Gold medal – first place	2005 Zalaegerszeg	Team foil
Gold medal – first place	2009 Plovdiv	Team foil
Gold medal – first place	2010 Leipzig	Team foil
Gold medal – first place	2011 Sheffield	Individual foil
Gold medal – first place	2011 Sheffield	Team foil
Gold medal – first place	2012 Legnano	Team foil
Gold medal – first place	2013 Zagreb	Individual foil
Gold medal – first place	2013 Zagreb	Team foil
Gold medal – first place	2014 Strasbourg	Individual foil
Gold medal – first place	2014 Strasbourg	Team foil
Gold medal – first place	2015 Montreux	Individual foil
Gold medal – first place	2015 Montreux	Team foil
Gold medal – first place	2019 Düsseldorf	Individual foil
Silver medal – second place	2006 İzmir	Individual foil
Silver medal – second place	2016 Toruń	Team foil
Bronze medal – third place	2004 Copenhagen	Team foil
Bronze medal – third place	2010 Leipzig	Individual foil
Bronze medal – third place	2019 Düsseldorf	Team foil

Elisa Di Francisca (Italian pronunciation: [eˈliza di franˈtʃiska]; born 13 December 1982) is an Italian former foil fencer, Olympic champion in 2012, World champion in 2010 and three-time European champion. She won the 2010–11 World Cup series and has seven World Cup victories to her name. With the Italian team, she was Olympic champion in 2012, five-time World champion and seven-time European champion.

== Biography ==
Di Francisca was born in Jesi, a town of the province of Ancona in Marche, to a Sicilian father and a mother from Marche. She is the eldest of three children: her sister Martina was born in 1984 and her brother Michele in 1991. She first tried ballet, but found it too quiet for her taste. Along with her sister, she turned to fencing, the town's national sport: led by maestro Ezio Triccoli, Club Scherma Jesi produced Olympic champions Stefano Cerioni, Giovanna Trillini and Valentina Vezzali. Di Francesca immediately took to the sport and went on after her sister gave up, dragging her brother in her wake.

In 2013 Di Francisca took part in the ninth edition of Ballando con le stelle, the Italian version of Dancing with the Stars. Paired with dancer Raimondo Todaro, she won with 56% of the vote.

Di Francisca is involved in several campaigns to end violence against women, testifying from her own experience of an abusive relationship when she was in high school. After the 2012 Summer Olympics she visited Kenya as part of a campaign by NGO Intervita Onlus to help underprivileged children and women. She is also committed to promoting Italy, especially Marche, her home region. She was one of the ambassadors of Expo 2015 and the face of the 2015 campaign of the Wine Institute of Marche promoting Verdicchio.

== Career ==
Di Francisca trained first under maestro Ezio Triccoli, then Giulio Tomassini and Stefano Cerioni. She soon showed promise, winning in 1995 the Italian national championship for her age class. In 2000, she earned a silver medal in the junior national championships and a bronze in the senior edition. She began taking part in international competitions, winning a bronze medal at the 2001 Junior World Cup event in Lyon.

=== 2004–2008 ===
She made her breakthrough in the 2003–04 season. She reached the quarter-finals at three senior World Cup events, in Como, St Petersburg and New York. These results caused her to be drafted as a reserve in the senior national team composed of Margherita Granbassi, Giovanna Trillini and Valentina Vezzali. At the European Championships in Copenhagen she placed fifth in the individual event and took a bronze medal with the team. She made her World Championships début at the New York event held on the sidelines of the 2004 Summer Olympics for women's team foil and sabre. Italy defeated Romania in the final, bringing Di Francisca her first world title. She finished the season No.21 in world rankings after a jump of 98 places.

In the 2004–05 season she climbed her first World Cup podium with a silver medal in Salzburg and went on to win the Havana World Cup. She claimed her first senior Italian title in the team event and her first European title, also with the team. The World Championships in Leipzig saw her début in the individual event. She reached the quarter-finals, where she lost to Hungary's Edina Knapek. These results pushed her to a No.6 world ranking.

The following season she placed third in the Seoul Grand Prix and the Marseille World Cup. She claimed her first individual European medal in İzmir, a silver, after defeating fellow Italian Claudia Pigliapoco in the semi-finals, but losing to Russia's Yana Ruzavina in the final. At the 2006 World Fencing Championships held on home ground in Turin Di Francisca lost again in the quarter-finals, this time to teammate Vezzali. In the team event director of foil Andrea Magro called Di Francisca in the quarter-finals against France to replace Granbassi, who was still emotional after having won the individual world title. Italy overcame France 32–30, then prevailed over Korea to meet Russia in the final. Di Francisca was called to replace Granbassi again after the latter lost 0–5 her bout to Aida Shanayeva. Entering on 15–19 in the last relay she defeated 4–1 Svetlana Boyko, allowing captain Vezzali to level the score. Italy was eventually defeated in sudden-death overtime and doomed to a silver medal.

2006–07 and 2007–08 were more difficult seasons, with only a silver medal at the 2007 Salzburg World Cup. Di Francisca was not selected into the team for the 2007 European Championships nor for the 2007 World Championships and failed to qualify for the 2008 Summer Olympics. She was offered to go to Beijing as a sparring partner for the team, but she refused, saying that if she was to travel for the sake of tourism, she preferred to choose her own destinations.

=== 2008–2012 ===
The 2008–09 season saw Di Francisca's return to form with four quarter-finals finishes and a silver medal at the Dallas World Cup. She was called again into the national team for the European Championships in Plovdiv. In the individual event she was stopped in table of 16 by teammate Arianna Errigo, but in the team event Italy defeated successively Romania, France and Russia to take back the continental title, four years after Zalaegerszeg. At the World Championships she reached the semi-finals after defeating Valentina Vezzali, then lost to Russia's Aida Shanayeva and came away with a bronze medal, her first individual distinction in World Championships. In the team event Italy met Russia in the final and took revenge for the lost match in Torino by defeating them 45–33, including a 5–0 bout by Di Francisca against Shanayeva. Italy was thus able to reclaim the world title that had eluded them since 2004. Di Francisca finished the season No.5 in World rankings.

The 2009–10 season saw her claim six World Cup medals, including a victory in the Marseille Grand Prix. At the European Championships in Leipzig she defeated Errigo in the quarter-finals, but lost to Russia's Yevgeniya Lamonova in the semi-finals and came away with a bronze medal. In the team event Italy maintained their domination, earning their third gold medal in a row. At the World Championships in Paris Di Francisca reached the semi-finals without any major hassle. She prevailed over World No.1 Nam Hyun-hee of Korea in the semi-finals and met Errigo in the final. Despite a good 8–5 start by Errigo, who had just eliminated Vezzali, Di Francisca levelled up on 9–9 and proceeded to win 15–11, claiming her first individual World title.

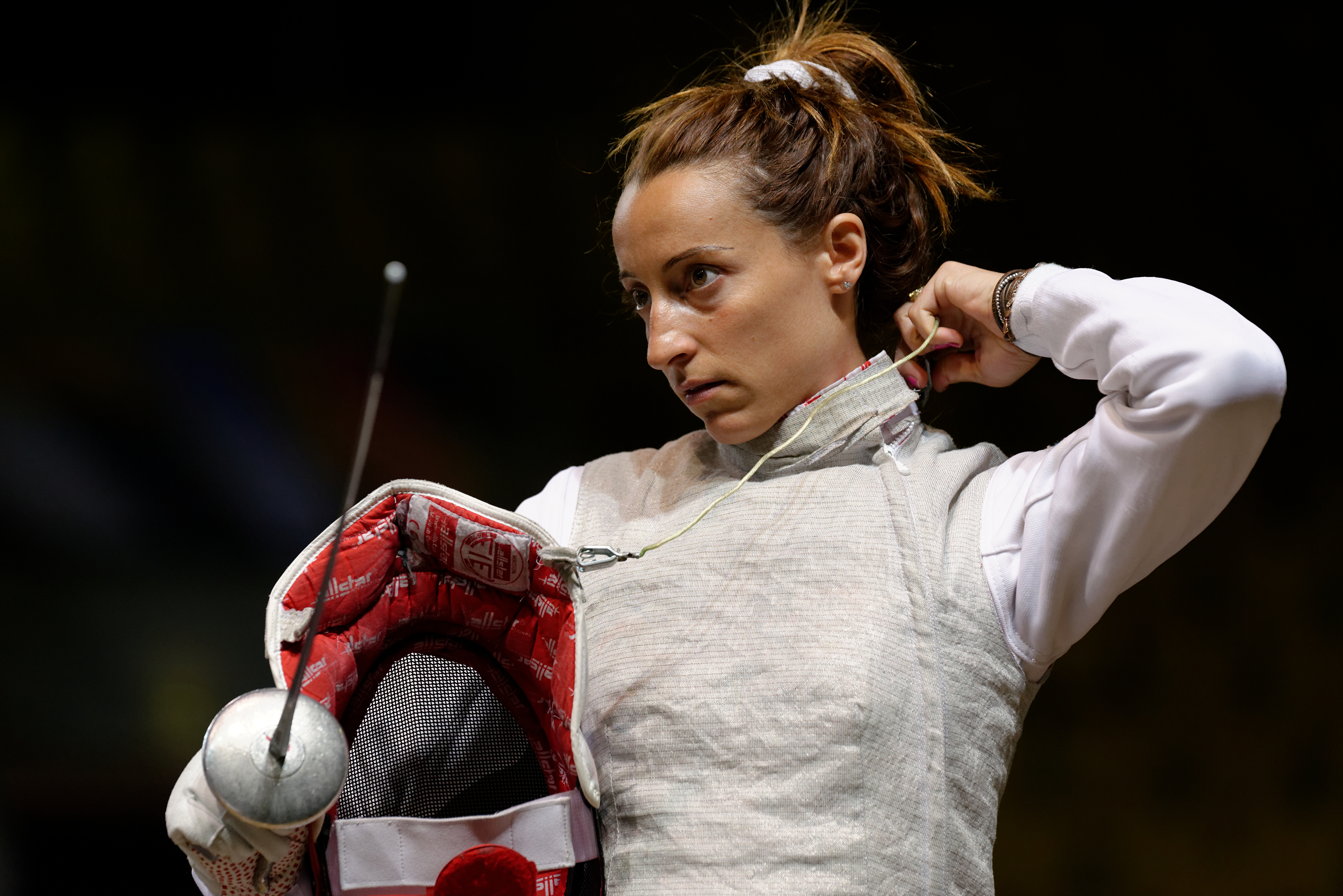
Di Francisca fastens her mask cord

In 2010–11 season Di Francisca earned a medal in six out of the seven World Cup events in which she took part, including two golds in Seoul and Tauberbischofsheim. At the European Championships she met again Vezzali in the final. After being led for the first two periods, Di Francisca levelled the score and hit twice in the last ten seconds to win the bout 10–8 and claim her first continental title. Vezzali took her revenge at the World Championships in Catania when they met once again in the final. Vezzali took a 0–6 lead in the first bout and kept until the final score of 7–15. "I didn't understand anything", commented Di Francisca. "It's as if she had a walkie talkie earpiece suggesting everything I was going to do. She anticipated everything and riposted." The silver medal however strengthened her ranking and she won the 2010–11 World Cup series.

The 2011–12 season saw her win the Tauberbischofsheim World Cup for the second time in a row, as well as the St Petersburg World Cup. At the European Championships in Legnano she lost in the quarter-finals to Russia's Larisa Korobeynikova. She qualified to the 2012 London Olympics as a member of the top-ranked Italian team. In the individual event she was seeded fourth and she received a bye in the first round. For her first Olympic bout she crushed Lebanon's Mona Shaito 15–2. In the table of 16 Germany's Carolin Golubytskyi took an early 8–3 lead against her, but Di Francisca managed to stop the onslaught. At 6–8 she was bridging the gap when she accidentally hit Golubytskyi under the mask with the bell guard of her foil. Her opponent stumbled to the ground and the bout had to be interrupted for medical care. Golubytskyi never regained her initial advantage and was defeated 15–9. Di Francisca prevailed over Japan's Chieko Sugawara on the same score. She had a narrow 11–10 victory in the semi-finals against Nam Hyun-hee, striking the winning hit in overtime. She then met fellow Italian Arianna Errigo in the final. After a slow start Di Francisca built a 7–3 lead in the second period, but Errigo managed to come back and the bout went into overtime with 11 all. Di Francisca received priority and scored immediately to win the Olympic title.

Italy entered the team event as a clear favourite, as the team was composed of the gold, silver and bronze medallists from the individual event. As the top seed, they received a bye in the first round. They proceeded to thrash Great Britain on the score of 45–14, then France on 45–22. Defending champion Russia offered less resistance than expected and Italy prevailed 45–31, allowing Di Francisca a double gold haul.

=== After the London Games ===
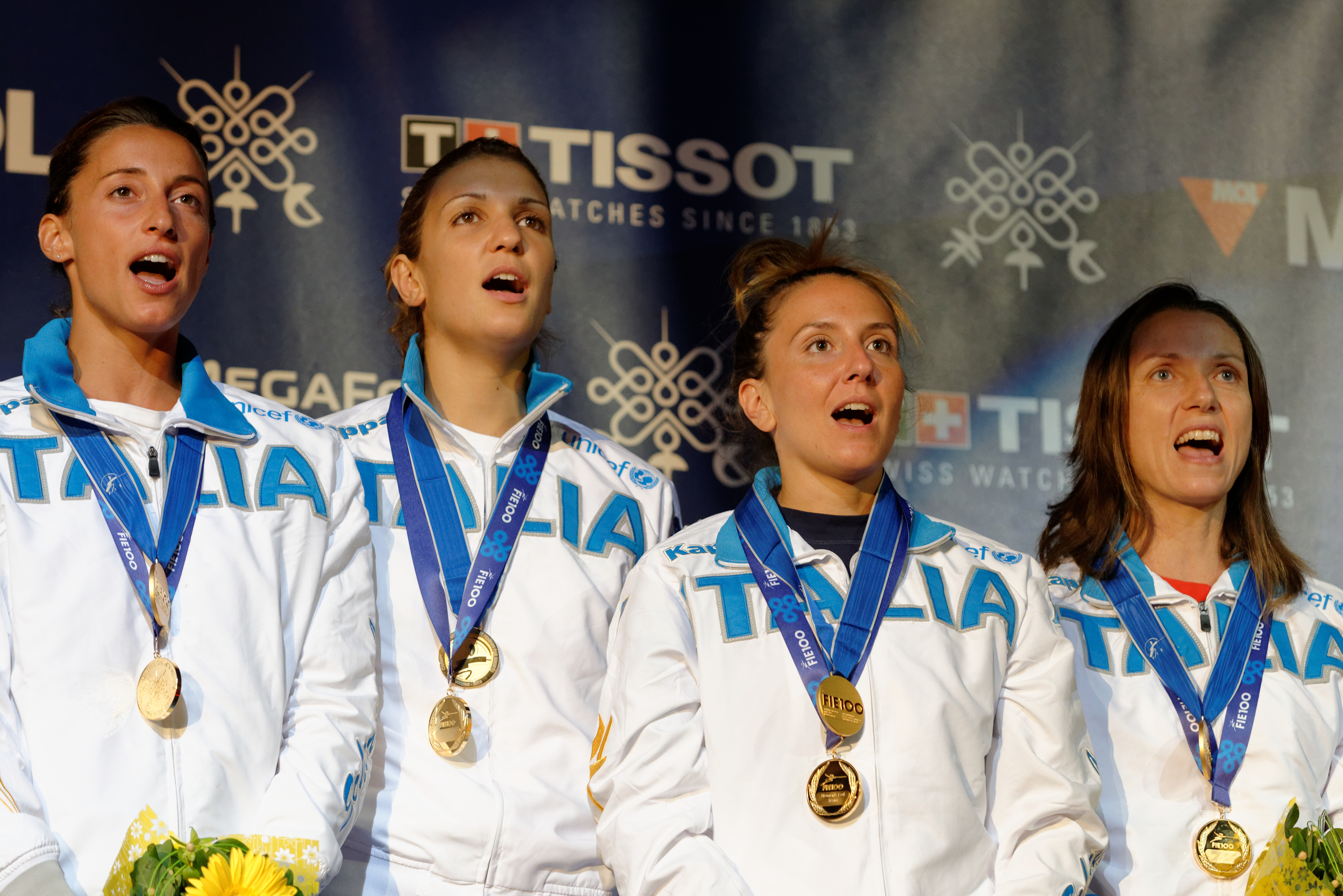
Di Francisca (L) sings the national anthem on the podium of the 2013 World Championships

After the Olympics the women's foil team national coach Stefano Cerioni announced he would leave the Italian Fencing Federation for the Russian Fencing Federation, their historical rivals. Cerioni had also been Di Francesca's own coach at CS Jesi for fourteen years. Di Francisca chose Olympic champion Giovanna Trillini as her new coach "because she is a great champion, because we know each other and we have fenced together and supported each other before London, and because this solution does not keep me away from Jesi, where are my family, my friends and my fencing hall."

In the 2012–13 season Di Francisca placed third at the Gdańsk Grand Prix and second at the Tauberbischofsheim World Cup. At the European Championships in Zagreb she inflicted a 15–5 defeat to Errigo in the quarter-finals and eventually won the continental title after prevailing against Russia's Diana Yakovleva. She dedicated her victory to motorcycle racer and fellow Jesi dweller Alessia Polita, who had just been critically injured during practice for the Italian championship at Misano.

A month later at the World Championships she cruised to the semi-finals, where she met Carolin Golubytskyi. The bout was marked by an incident similar to that of their London Olympic encounter: during a collision Di Francisca struck a hard blow to Golubytskyi's mask with her bell guard, sending her opponent stumbling. She was shown a red card for dangerous action and received a penalty hit. The bout went into overtime and Golubytskyi struck the winning hit, dooming Di Francisca to a bronze medal. In the team event the Italian "Dream Team" asserted their domination in emphatic manner, cruising to the final then prevailing 45–18 against France to earn the world title.

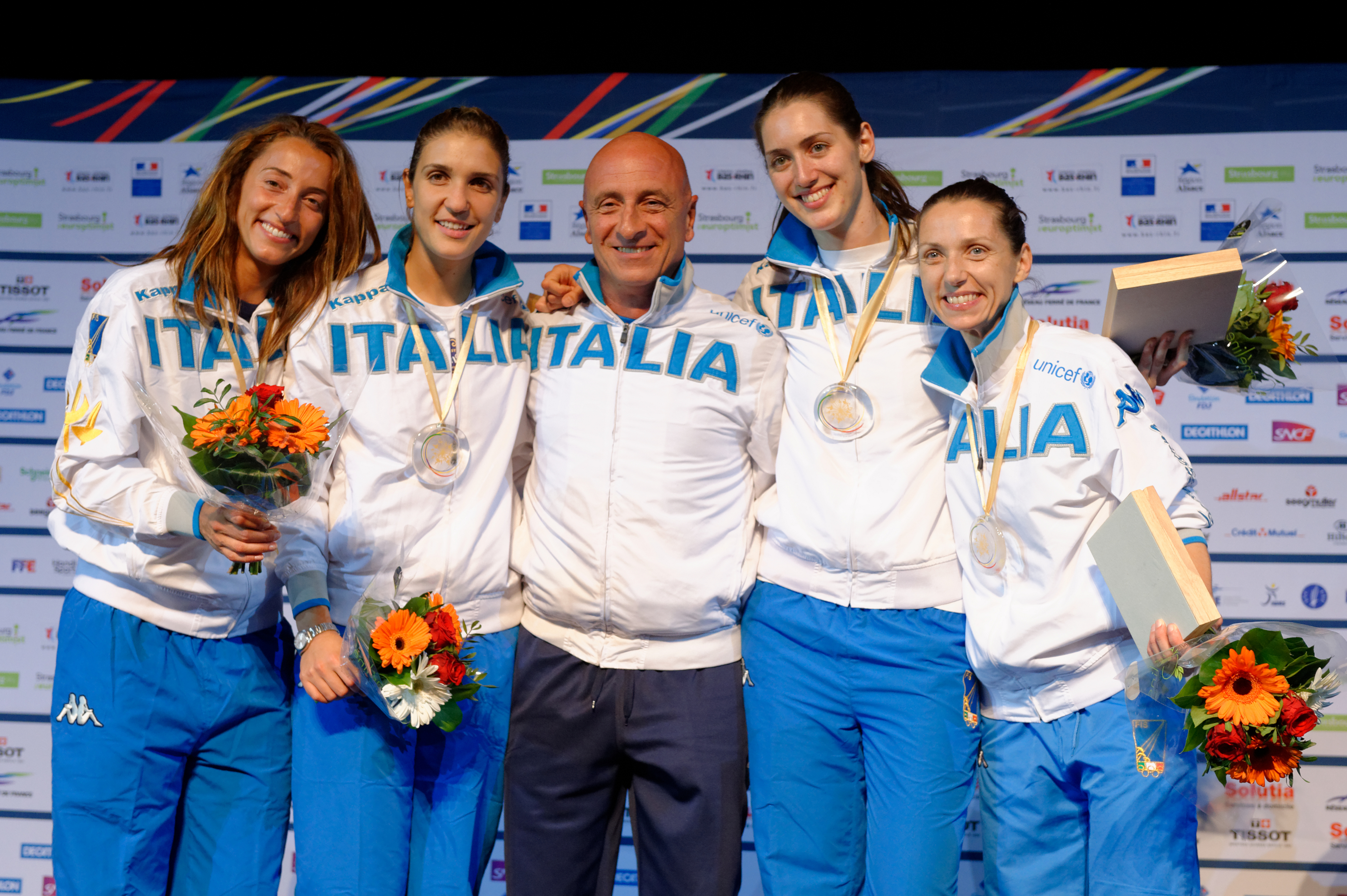
Di Francisca (L) with Team Italy and coach Andrea Cipressa on the podium of the 2014 European Championships

In the 2013–14 season Di Francisca claimed three silver medals in St Petersburg, Tauberbischofsheim and Turin, as well as a bronze medal in Marseille. At the European Championships in Strasbourg she made her way to the semi-finals where she met Valentina Vezzali. After a cagey beginning which saw the first period end on 1 all, Di Francisca took control of the bout, striking 10 hits in a row and closing on 15–3. In the final she met another Italian, Martina Batini, against whom she had lost in the final at Tauberbischofsheim earlier in the season. Her opponent took a 5–2 lead, but Di Francisca hit 13 times in a row to conquer her third European title. In the team event Italy reached the final without any hassle, but met with strong opposition from Russia, who led most of the match. Chosen to close against Inna Deriglazova, Di Francisca entered the last leg on 38–40 for Russia. Deriglazova gained a 4–0 lead, taking the score to 44–38 with only one hit needed for the victory and 2′04″ to go. Di Francisca hit six times in a row to level the score. She finally struck the winning hit with one second remaining, allowing Italy to retain their European title and taking her second double European gold haul in a row.

At the World Championships in Kazan Di Francisca had a tight 15–14 victory over Egypt's Eman Shaaban, then reached easily the quarter-finals. She met Martina Batini, who took revenge of the Strasbourg final by defeating her 15–6. In the team event, Italy cruised again to the final, where they met Russia once more. The score stayed very tight until the three last legs. Di Francisca entered the penultimate leg on 33–35 for Italy and consolidated the advantage, taking it to 35–40 before Errigo closed on 45–39. Italy finished the year having won all team competitions.

In the 2014–15 season Di Francesca earned a silver medal in the Turin Grand Prix after losing 7–15 to Arianna Errigo in the final. After the Gdańsk World Cup in January 2015 she had a problem with her left ankle and was rested for the following World Cup stage in Algiers. She bounced back to win three competitions in a row: the Havana Grand PrixTauberbischofsheim, the Tauberbischofsheim World Cup and the Shanghai Grand Prix.

== Personal life ==
Elisa Di Francisca is married to Ivan Villa and has two children. She considers herself Roman Catholic.
