= María Luisa Doig =

Peruvian fencer (born 1991)

Personal information
- Full name: María Luisa Doig Calderón
- Born: 13 August 1991 (age 34) Lima, Peru
- Height: 1.69 m (5 ft 7 in)
- Weight: 61 kg (134 lb)

Sport
- Country: Peru
- Sport: Fencing
- Events: Foil and Épée
Medal record
Women's fencing
Representing Peru
Pan American Games
Silver medal – second place	2023 Santiago	Épée

María Luisa Doig Calderón (born August 13, 1991) is a Peruvian foil and epee fencer. At age sixteen, Doig made her official debut for the 2008 Summer Olympics in Beijing, where she competed in the women's individual foil event. She lost the first preliminary round match to Germany's Katja Wächter, with a score of 4–15.

Olympic Games
Preceded by Ornella Oettl Reyes	Flag bearer for Peru; Paris 2024 with Juan Postigos	Succeeded by Incumbent
