= 2006 World Fencing Championships =

International fencing competition

2006 World Championships in Fencing
- Dates: September 29 – October 7
- Host city: Turin, Italy

Official logo

The 2006 World Fencing Championships were held at the Oval Lingotto in Turin, Italy. The event took place from 29 September to 7 October 2006.

== Medal table ==
* Host nation (Italy)

Rank	Nation	Gold	Silver	Bronze	Total
1	France (FRA)	4	1	1	6
2	Russia (RUS)	2	0	3	5
3	China (CHN)	2	0	1	3
4	Italy (ITA)*	1	3	3	7
5	United States (USA)	1	2	1	4
6	Hungary (HUN)	1	1	2	4
7	Germany (GER)	1	1	1	3
8	Estonia (EST)	0	1	1	2
8	Ukraine (UKR)	0	1	1	2
10	Portugal (POR)	0	1	0	1
10	Spain (ESP)	0	1	0	1
12	South Korea (KOR)	0	0	3	3
13	Canada (CAN)	0	0	1	1
Totals (13 entries)		12	12	18	42

== Medal summary ==
=== Men's events ===
Event	Gold	Silver	Bronze
Épée	(China) Wang Lei	(Portugal) Joaquim Videira	(Canada) Igor Tikhomirov (Estonia) Sven Järve
Foil	(Germany) Peter Joppich	(Italy) Andrea Baldini	(Italy) Stefano Barrera (China) Lei Sheng
Sabre	(Russia) Stanislav Pozdnyakov	(Hungary) Zsolt Nemcsik	(Russia) Aleksey Frosin (South Korea) Won Woo-young
Team Épée	France; Érik Boisse; Gauthier Grumier; Fabrice Jeannet; Ulrich Robeiri	Spain; José Luis Abajo; Ignacio Canto; Juan Castañeda; Eduardo Sepulveda Puerto	Ukraine; Dmytro Chumak; Dmytro Karyuchenko; Maksym Khvorost; Bohdan Nikishyn
Team Foil	France; Loïc Attely; Nicolas Beaudan; Erwann Le Péchoux; Marcel Marcilloux	Germany; Dominik Behr; Richard Breutner; Peter Joppich; Benjamin Kleibrink	Italy; Andrea Baldini; Andrea Cassarà; Salvatore Sanzo; Simone Vanni
Team Sabre	France; Vincent Anstett; Nicolas Lopez; Julien Pillet; Boris Sanson	Ukraine; Dmytro Boiko; Volodymyr Lukashenko; Oleh Shturbabin; Vladyslav Tretiak	Russia; Aleksey Frosin; Nikolay Kovalev; Stanislav Pozdnyakov; Aleksey Yakimenko

=== Women's events ===
Event	Gold	Silver	Bronze
Épée	(Hungary) Tímea Nagy	(Estonia) Irina Embrich	(Hungary) Emese Szász (France) Laura Flessel-Colovic
Foil	(Italy) Margherita Granbassi	(Italy) Valentina Vezzali	(Hungary) Aida Mohamed (Italy) Giovanna Trillini
Sabre	(United States) Rebecca Ward	(United States) Mariel Zagunis	(United States) Sada Jacobson (South Korea) Kim Hye-lim
Team Épée	China; Li Na; Luo Xiaojuan; Zhang Li; Zhong Weiping	France; Marysa Baradji-Duchêne; Laura Flessel-Colovic; Hajnalka Kiraly Picot; Maureen Nisima	Germany; Claudia Bokel; Imke Duplitzer; Britta Heidemann; Marijana Markovic
Team Foil	Russia; Svetlana Boyko; Aida Shanayeva; Julia Khakimova; Ianna Rouzavina	Italy; Elisa di Francisca; Margherita Granbassi; Giovanna Trillini; Valentina Vezzali	South Korea; Jeon Hee-sook; Jung Gil-ok; Nam Hyun-hee; Seo Mi-jung
Team Sabre	France; Cécile Argiolas; Solenne Mary; Léonore Perrus; Anne-Lise Touya	United States; Sada Jacobson; Caitlin Thompson; Rebecca Ward; Mariel Zagunis	Russia; Yekaterina Dyachenko; Ekaterina Fedorkina; Yelena Nechayeva; Sofiya Velikaya
