= Julia Khakimova =

Russian fencer

Personal information
- Full name: Yuliya Ildusovna Kakhimova
- Born: 28 February 1981 (age 45)

Fencing career
- Sport: Fencing
- Country: USA
- Former country: Russia
- Weapon: foil
- Hand: right-handed
- Club: MGFSO
- Head coach: Vladislav Pavlovich
- Assistant coach: Anvar Ibragimov
- Former coach: Viktor Khashimov
- FIE ranking: Current ranking
Medal record
Women's Fencing
Representing Russia
Universiade
Bronze medal – third place	2005 İzmir	Individual Foil
World Fencing Championships
Gold medal – first place	2006 Turin	Team Foil
Silver medal – second place	2007 St. Petersburg	Team foil

Julia Khakimova (Russian: Юлия Ильдусовна Хакимова; born 28 February 1981) is a Russian foil fencer.

== Russia ==
Khakimova won the gold medal in the foil team event at the 2006 World Fencing Championships after beating Italy in the final. She accomplished this with her teammates Aida Shanayeva, Svetlana Boyko and Ianna Rouzavina.

At the 2005 Summer Universiade, Khakimova won a bronze medal in the individual women's foil event.

== United States ==
In 2013 Julia along with her husband, former head coach of the Russian National Junior Team Vadim Ayupov, opened their own fencing club - the United Fencing Academy (UFA), in Woodland Hills, CA.
