= Indra Angad-Gaur =

Dutch fencer (born 1974)

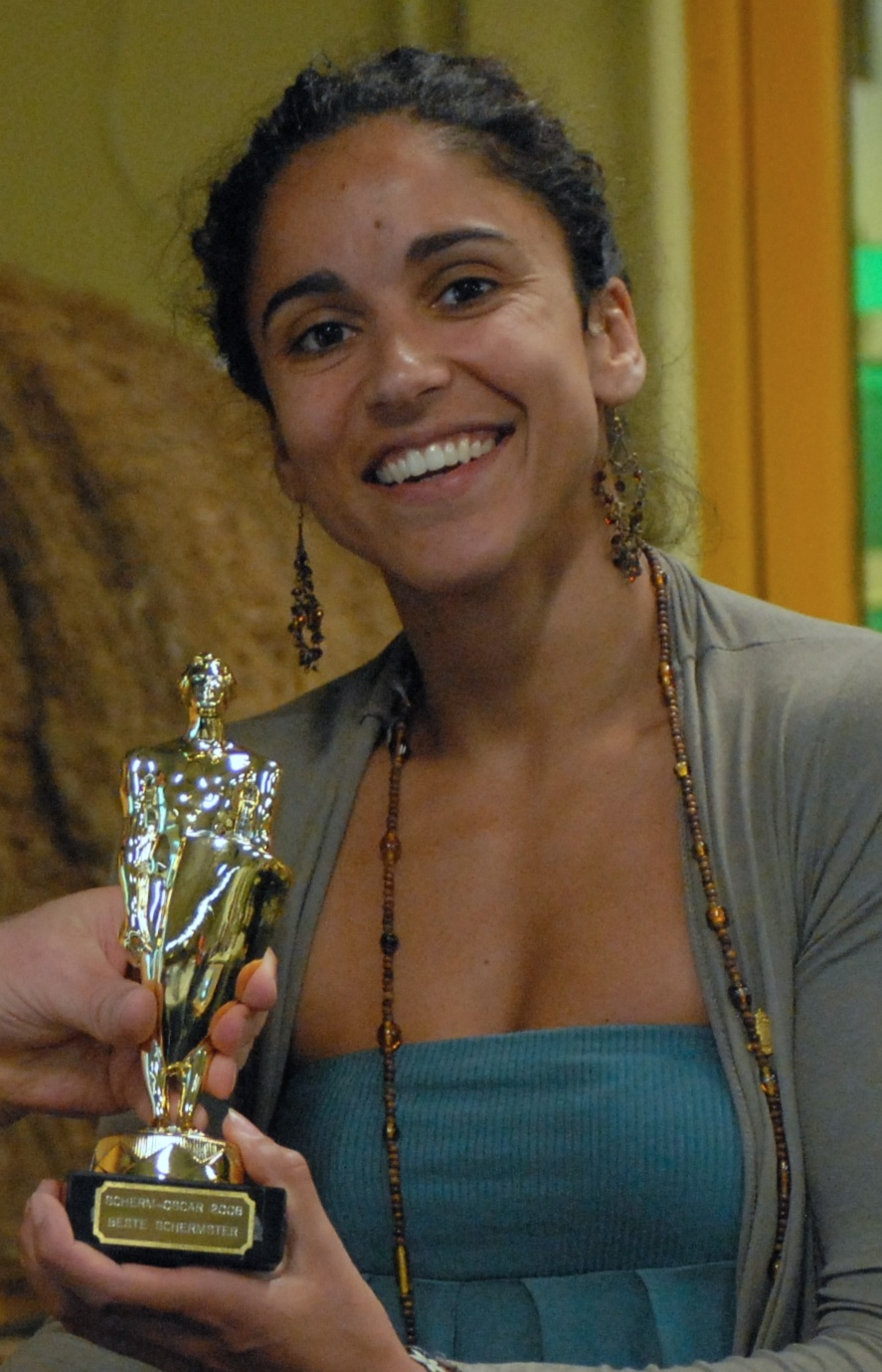

Personal information
- Born: 4 March 1974 (age 52) The Hague, Netherlands
- Home town: Rotterdam
- Height: 1.70 m (5 ft 7 in)
- Weight: 60 kg (132 lb)

Fencing career
- Sport: Fencing
- Country: Netherlands
- Weapon: foil
- Hand: right-handed
- Retired: 2010
- FIE ranking: current ranking

Indra Angad-Gaur (born 4 March 1974 in The Hague) is a retired female foil fencer from the Netherlands.

During her career she won three bronze medals in Fencing World Cup events: at Shanghai and Cairo in the 2004–05 season, and at Leipzig in the 2007–08 season. She also qualified for the 2008 Summer Olympics in which she won against Egyptian Eman El Gammal in the first round before being eliminated by Italy's Margherita Granbassi in the second round.

She retired from international competition in 2010. She is now an international referee in the three weapons.
