= Débora Nogueira =

Portuguese fencer (born 1985)

Personal information
- Full name: Débora Patrícia Teixeira Artur; Candeias Nogueira
- Born: 26 October 1985 (age 40) Almada, Setúbal, Portugal
- Height: 1.65 m (5 ft 5 in)
- Weight: 58 kg (128 lb)

Sport
- Country: Portugal
- Sport: Fencing
- Event: Foil
- Club: Ginásio Clube Português
- Coached by: Eduardo Pereira

Débora Patrícia Teixeira Artur Candeias Nogueira (born October 26, 1985, in Almada, Setúbal) is a Portuguese foil fencer. Nogueira qualified for the women's individual foil event at the 2008 Summer Olympics in Beijing, after finishing second from the European Qualification Tournament in Lisbon. She lost the first preliminary round match to China's Su Wanwen, with a score of 4–15.
