= Katja Wächter =

German fencer

Personal information
- Nationality: Germany
- Born: 28 January 1982 (age 44) Leipzig, Sachsen, East Germany
- Height: 1.75 m (5 ft 9 in)
- Weight: 68 kg (150 lb)

Sport
- Sport: Fencing
- Event: Foil
- Club: Cercle d'escrime Melun Val de Seine
- Coached by: Ingo Weissborn
Medal record
Women's fencing
Representing Germany
World Championships
Bronze medal – third place	2009 Antalya	Team foil
European Championships
Silver medal – second place	2009 Plovdiv	Foil
Silver medal – second place	2010 Leipzig	Team foil
Bronze medal – third place	2011 Sheffield	Team foil

Katja Wächter (born 28 January 1982 in Leipzig, Sachsen) is a German foil fencer. In 2009, Wachter won a silver medal for the same weapon at the European Championships in Plovdiv, Bulgaria, and bronze, as a member of the German fencing team, at the World Championships in Antalya, Turkey.

Wachter represented Germany at the 2008 Summer Olympics in Beijing, where she competed in two foil events. For her first event, the women's individual foil, Wachter defeated Peru's María Luisa Doig, Romania's Cristina Stahl, and France's Corinne Maîtrejean in the preliminary rounds, before losing out the quarterfinal match to Italy's Giovanna Trillini, with a score of 8–15. Few days later, she joined with her fellow fencers and teammates Melanie Wolgast, Anja Schache, and Carolin Golubytskyi for the women's team foil. Wachter and her team, however, lost the fifth place match to the Chinese team (led by Zhang Lei), with a total score of 28 touches.
