= Eman El Gammal =

Egyptian fencer

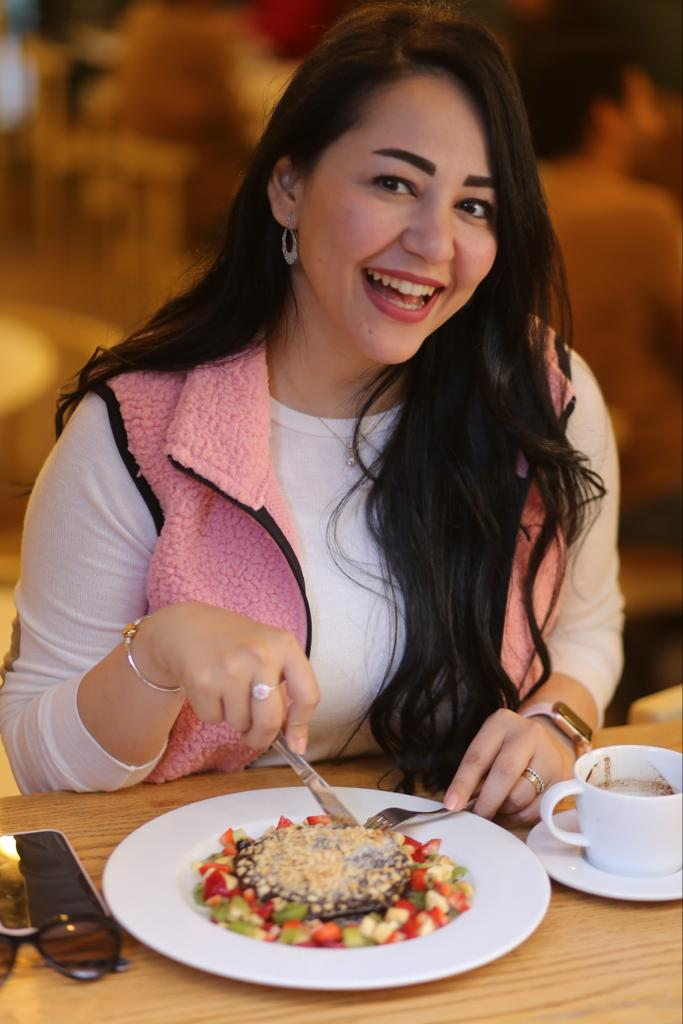

Eman El Gammal is an Egyptian fencer. At the 2008 Olympics, she competed both as an individual and in the Egyptian team, losing in the first round to the Netherlands' Indra Angad-Gaur and the team lost in the first round to Russia. At the 2012 Summer Olympics she competed in the Women's foil, and was defeated by Venezuela's Johana Fuenmayor 9-15 in the first round. The Egyptian women's team that she was part of also lost in the first round.

Her sister Shaimaa El-Gammal has also been an Olympic fencer, who became Egypt's first female competitor to appear in four Olympic games, at the 2000, 2004, 2008 and 2012 Summer Olympics.
