= Misleydis Compañy =

Cuban fencer (born 1982)

Personal information
- Born: April 6, 1982 (age 44)
Medal record
Women's Fencing
Representing Cuba
Pan American Games
Gold medal – first place	2007 Rio de Janeiro	Team Sabre
Bronze medal – third place	2007 Rio de Janeiro	Foil
Bronze medal – third place	2007 Rio de Janeiro	Team Foil

Misleydis Compañy (born April 6, 1982, in Granma) is a female fencer from Cuba. She competed for her native country at the 2008 Summer Olympics in the foil competition, and won three medals at the 2007 Pan American Games.
