= Svetlana Boyko (fencer) =

Russian foil fencer

Personal information
- Born: 13 April 1972 (age 54) Rostov-na-Donu, Russian SFSR, Soviet Union

Sport
- Sport: Fencing
Medal record
Women's fencing
Representing Russia
Olympic Games
Gold medal – first place	2008 Beijing	Team foil
World Championships
Gold medal – first place	2002 Lisbon	Individual foil
Gold medal – first place	2002 Lisbon	Team foil
Gold medal – first place	2006 Turin	Team foil
Silver medal – second place	1998 La Chaux-de-Fonds	Individual foil
Silver medal – second place	2001 Nîmes	Team foil
Silver medal – second place	2003 Havana	Team foil
Bronze medal – third place	1999 Seoul	Individual foil
Summer Universiade
Bronze medal – third place	1999 Palma de Mallorca	Individual foil
Bronze medal – third place	1999 Palma de Mallorca	Team foil

Svetlana Anatolyevna Boyko (Russian: Светлана Анатольевна Бойко; born 13 April 1972) is a Russian foil fencer.

== Career ==
Boyko won the gold medal in the foil team event at the 2006 World Fencing Championships after beating Italy in the final. She accomplished this with her teammates Aida Chanaeva, Julia Khakimova, and Ianna Rouzavina.

On 15 August 2008 Boiko, with teammates Aida Chanaeva, Victoria Nikichina and Evgenia Lamonova, beat the United States team 28 to 11, winning the gold medals of 2008 Olympic Games. This was her fourth consecutive olympic appearance, now as the captain of the national team. Boiko was known among her teammates as Mama Sveta on account of her experience, and because she actually had two daughters.

On the domestic stage, Boiko was affiliated with CSKA and was a Major in the Russian Armed Forces, as of 16 August 2008. After winning the 2008 olympic event, Boiko announced her retirement.

== Achievements ==
2006 World Fencing Championships, team foil
