= Martina Emanuel =

British foil fencer

Personal information
- Born: 26 December 1985 (age 40) Milan, Italy
- Height: 1.69 m (5 ft 7 in)
- Weight: 64 kg (141 lb; 10.1 st)

Fencing career
- Sport: Fencing
- Weapon: foil
- Hand: right-handed
- Club: Salle Paul, London
- FIE ranking: current ranking

Martina Emanuel (born 26 December 1985) is a British foil fencer.

She qualified to the women's foil event at the 2008 Summer Olympics in Beijing by reaching the final at the zone qualifying tournament held in Lisbon. At the Olympics she lost in the first round to the USA's Erinn Smart.

At the 2012 Summer Olympics she was a member of the Great Britain team which participated as hosts to the women's team foil event. They beat Egypt in the first round, but lost in the quarter-finals to Italy.
