= Margherita Granbassi =

Italian fencer (born 1979)

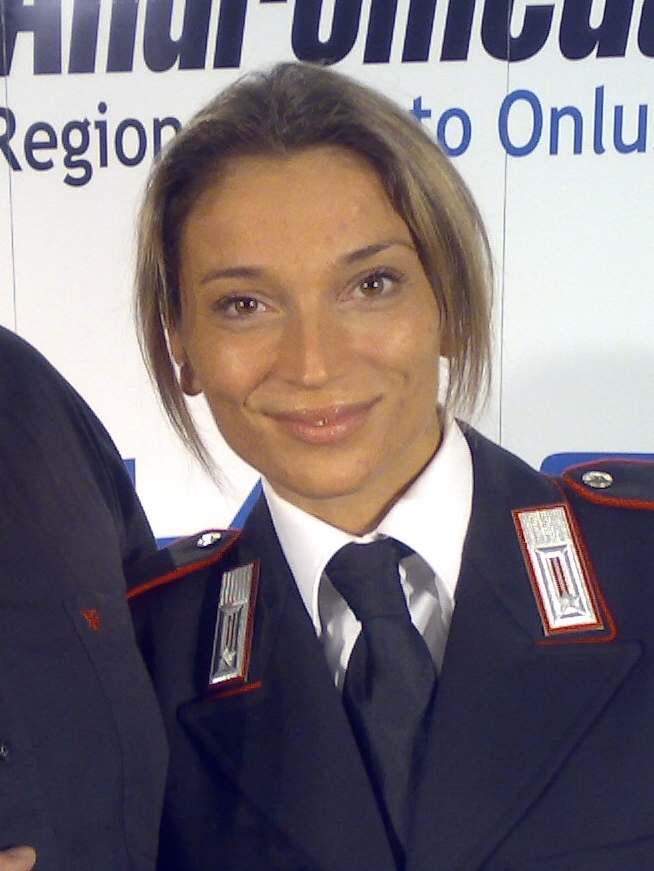
- Granbassi in 2008

Personal information
- Born: 1 September 1979 (age 47) Trieste, Italy
- Life partner: Marco Gargari
- Children: 1

Sport
- Country: Italy
- Sport: Fencing
Medal record
Women's fencing
Representing Italy
Olympic Games
| Bronze medal – third place | 2008 Beijing | Foil |
| Bronze medal – third place | 2008 Beijing | Team foil |
World Championships
| Gold medal – first place | 2004 New York | Team foil |
| Gold medal – first place | 2006 Turin | Foil |
| Silver medal – second place | 2006 Turin | Team foil |
| Silver medal – second place | 2007 St-Peterburg | Foil |
European Championships
| Silver medal – second place | 2006 İzmir | Foil |

Margherita Granbassi (Italian pronunciation: [marɡeˈriːta ɡramˈbassi]; born 1 September 1979) is an Italian foil fencer.

Granbassi won the gold medal at the foil 2006 World Fencing Championships after beating her compatriot Valentina Vezzali 7–6 in the final. Later in the tournament she also won a silver in the team's foil event together with teammates Vezzali, Elisa Di Francisca and Giovanna Trillini. She took the bronze medal on 11 August 2008 at the Beijing Olympics, defeating her teammate Giovanna Trillini 15–12.

== Early life ==
Margherita Granbassi was born on 1 September 1979 in Trieste, Italy, to Istrian Italian exiles from Pisino. Her grandfather came to Trieste from Pisino to study, and eventually settled there. Granbassi has stated that she always felt in her family "a feeling of Istrian [Italian] origin".

== Career ==
She started fencing because of her brothers who also practiced the sport, and her first teacher was Silvia Strukel. After starting fencing in Trieste, she went to train in Udine for 11 years, being driven there every day by her mother while listening to an audio cassette on which she had registered the day's school lesson. In 1991, Granbassi won her first Italian title. She was called up for the first international bouts in 1994. In 1996 she won gold medals at the Italian Under-17 and Under-20 championships.

She won again the Italian Under-20 championship as well as the World Under-20 Championship in 1998 and 1999. She joined the Italian national team as a sparring partner and went with them to Sidney for the 2000 Summer Olympics. After the Olympic games she became part of the national team, winning a team gold at the 2001 European Fencing Championships, followed by a silver at the 2003 European Fencing Championships, a gold at the 2004 World Fencing Championships, and another gold at the 2005 European Fencing Championships.

She won the gold medal at the 2006 World Fencing Championships in the individual foil event. This was followed by a silver in individual foil at the 2007 World Fencing Championships. Granbassi won two bronze medals at the 2008 Summer Olympics, in both individual foil and team foil.

== Personal life ==
Margherita Granbassi has a daughter to former partner Jacques Petrillo; she identifies as Roman Catholic.
