= Nam Hyun-hee =

South Korean fencer (born 1981)

Nam Hyun-Hee
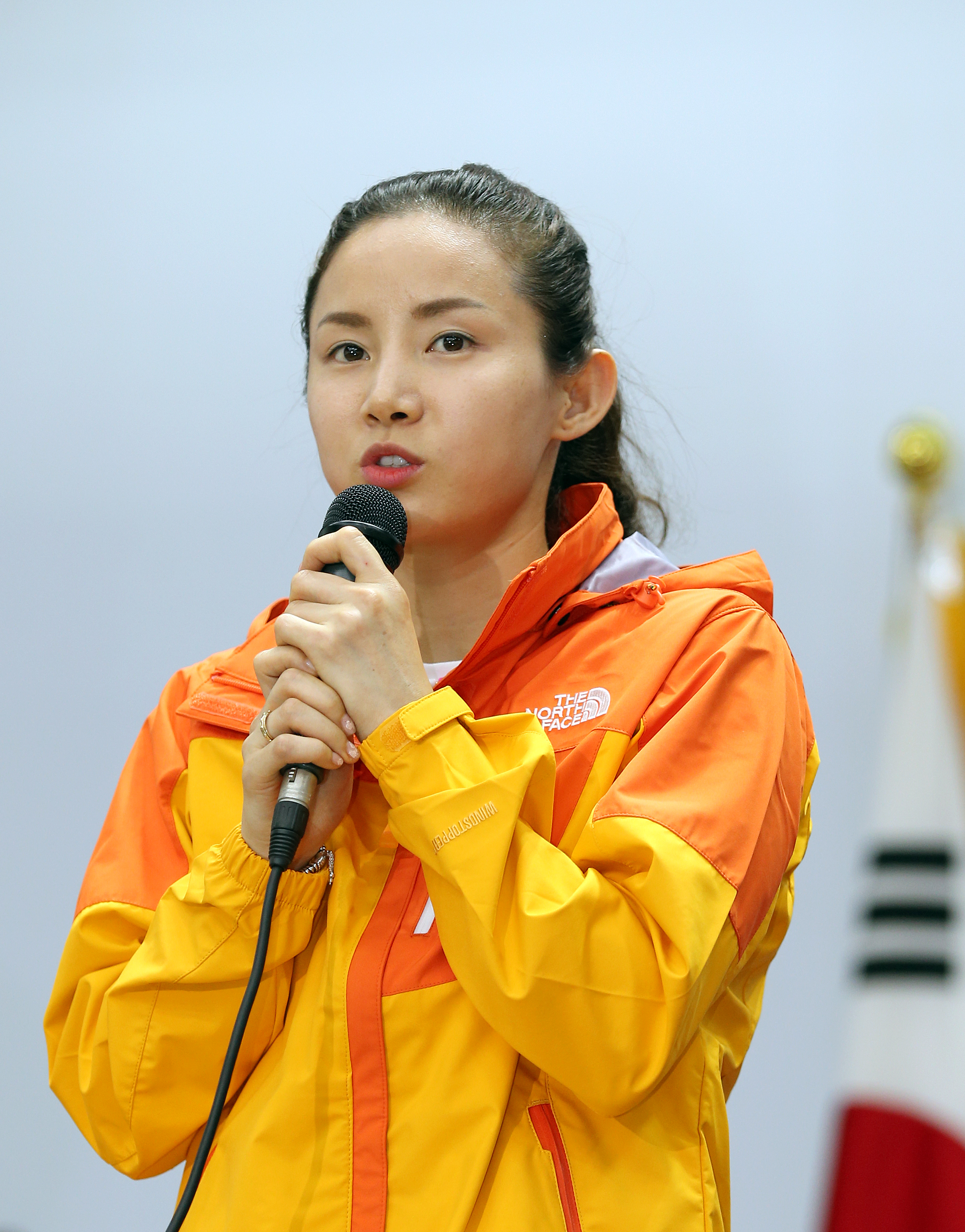
- Nam Hyun-Hee at Joint Press Conference of Team Korea for 17th Asian Games Incheon 2014

Personal information
- Born: 29 September 1981 (age 44) Seongnam, South Korea
- Height: 1.57 m (5 ft 2 in)
- Weight: 44 kg (97 lb)

Sport
- Sport: Fencing
Medal record
Women's fencing
Representing South Korea
Olympic Games
Silver medal – second place	2008 Beijing	Foil
Bronze medal – third place	2012 London	Team foil
World Championships
Gold medal – first place	2005 Leipzig	Team foil
Bronze medal – third place	2006 Turin	Team foil
Bronze medal – third place	2010 Paris	Foil
Bronze medal – third place	2010 Paris	Team foil
Bronze medal – third place	2011 Catania	Foil
Bronze medal – third place	2011 Catania	Team foil
Asian Games
Gold medal – first place	2002 Busan	Team foil
Gold medal – first place	2006 Doha	Foil
Gold medal – first place	2006 Doha	Team foil
Gold medal – first place	2010 Guangzhou	Foil
Gold medal – first place	2010 Guangzhou	Team foil
Gold medal – first place	2014 Incheon	Team foil
Bronze medal – third place	2014 Incheon	Foil

- Nam Hyun-hee
- Hangul: 남현희
- Hanja: 南賢喜
- RR: Nam Hyeonhui
- MR: Nam Hyŏnhŭi

Nam Hyun-Hee (Korean: 남현희; Hanja: 南賢喜; Korean pronunciation: [nam.ɦjʌn.ɦi] or [nam] [hjʌn.ɦi]; born 29 September 1981) is a South Korean foil fencer. She is left-handed.

She won the silver medal at the 2008 Summer Olympics after losing 6-5 to Valentina Vezzali in the final. She was also a team bronze medalist at the 2012 Summer Olympics, with South Korea beating France in the bronze medal match. Her teammates were Jeon Hee-Sok, Jung Gil-Ok and Oh Ha-Na.

At the World Championship level, she was twice a world bronze medalist as an individual (2010 and 2011). She was also part of the Korean team that won the team world championship in 2005. Nam was also part of the Korean teams that won the bronze medal in the foil team event at the 2006 World Fencing Championships, after beating Poland in the bronze medal match with her teammates Jeon, Jung and Seo Mi-Jung, 2010 World Championships, beating Germany with teammates Jeon, Seo and Oh, and the 2011 World Championship, beating Poland again, this time with teammates Jeon, Jung and Lee Hye-Sun.

She was chosen to give the athlete's oath at the 2014 Asian Games.

She was married to cyclist Gong Hyo-suk. Nam ran a fencing club in Seoul's Gangnam district after retiring in 2019.

After her divorce, she announced in October 2023 that she had decided to marry Jeon Cheong-jo, the third generation son of the Paradise Group which is a South Korean casino and resort conglomerate. Two weeks later, it was revealed that Jeon was a female fraudster, who was actually from a working class household in South Korea. Jeon had been previously convicted on multiple accounts of fraud and scamming people. Jeon Cheong-jo was arrested and accused of stealing more than 3 billion won (€2.1 million) from 27 people between April 2022 and October 2023. In 2024, Jeon was sentenced to 12 years in prison. Nam was banned from leaving South Korea.

== Filmography ==
=== Television shows ===
Year	Title	Role	Notes	Ref.
2020	King of Mask Singer	Contestant	as "Already One Year" (episode 287)	
2022	Can't Cheat Blood	Participant		
