= Jeon Hee-sook =

South Korean fencer (born 1984)

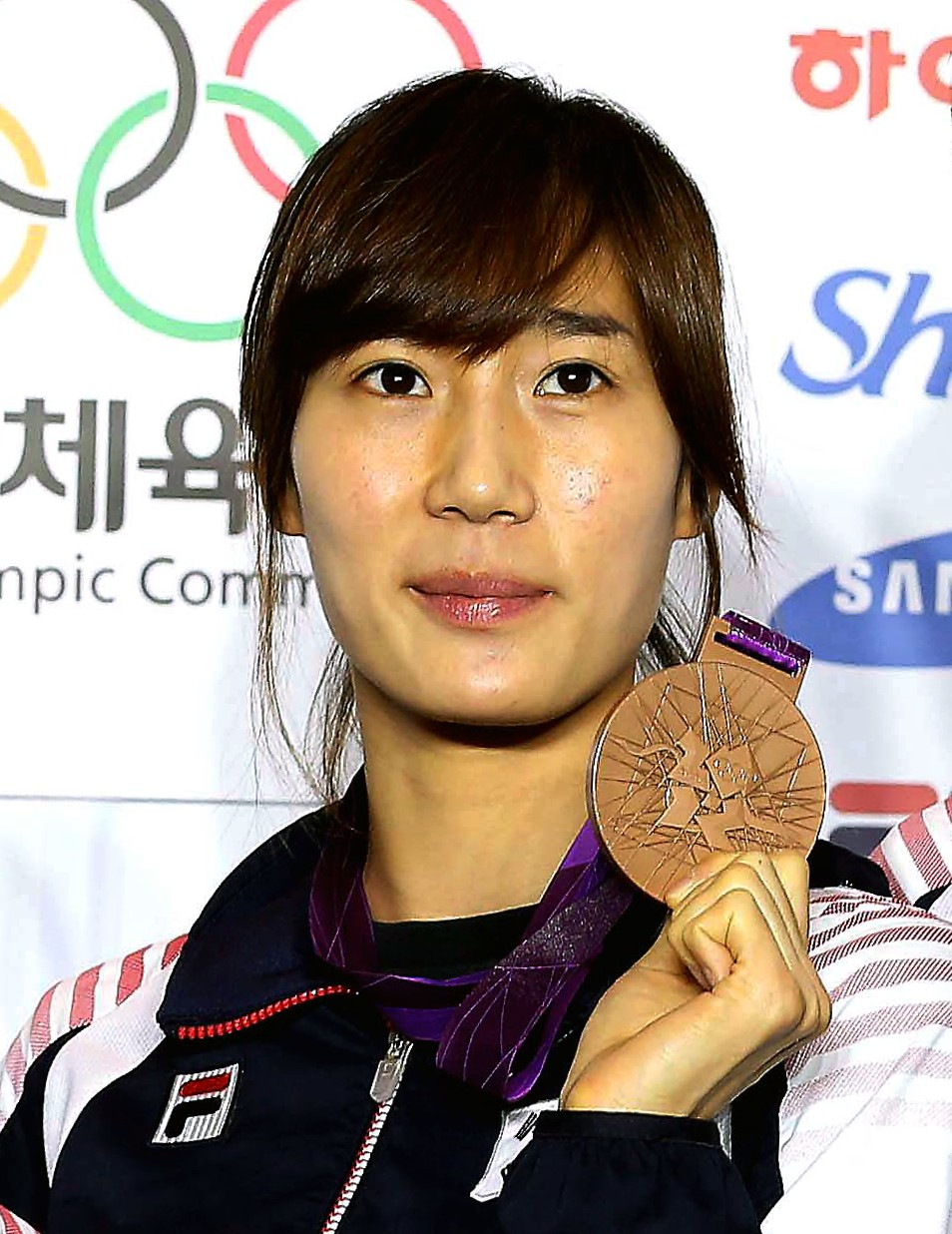

Medal record

Women's fencing

Representing South Korea

Olympic Games
Bronze medal – third place	2012 London	Team foil

World Championships
Silver medal – second place	2009 Antalya	Foil
Bronze medal – third place	2006 Turin	Team foil
Bronze medal – third place	2010 Paris	Team foil
Bronze medal – third place	2011 Catania	Team foil

Asian Games
Gold medal – first place	2014 Incheon	Individual
Gold medal – first place	2018 Jakarta	Individual
Gold medal – first place	2014 Incheon	Team foil

Universiade
Silver medal – second place	2011 Shenzhen	Foil

- Jeon Hee-sook
- Hangul: 전희숙
- Hanja: 全希淑
- RR: Jeon Huisuk
- MR: Chŏn Hŭisuk

Jeon Hee-sook (Korean: 전희숙; Korean pronunciation: [tɕʌn.ɦi.suk̚] or [tɕʌn] [hi.suk̚]; born 16 June 1984 in Seoul) is a South Korean foil fencer.

Jeon won the bronze medal in the foil team event at the 2006 World Fencing Championships after beating Poland in the bronze medal match. She accomplished this with her team mates Jung Gil-ok, Seo Mi-jung and Nam Hyun-hee.

In 2019, she won the gold medal in the women's foil event at the 2019 Asian Fencing Championships held in Chiba, Japan. She also won the silver medal in the women's team foil event.

== Achievements ==
2009 World Fencing Championships, individual foil
2006 World Fencing Championships, team foil
