= Shaimaa El-Gammal =

Egyptian fencer

Personal information
- Born: 30 January 1980 (age 46)

Sport
- Sport: Fencing

Shaimaa El-Gammal (born 30 January 1980) is an Egyptian fencer. She competed in the women's foil events at the 2000, 2004, 2008 and 2012 Summer Olympics, becoming her nation's first female competitor to appear in four Olympic games.

Her sister, Eman El Gammal was also an Olympic fencer at the 2008 and 2012 Summer Olympics.
