= Anja Schache =

German fencer

Personal information
- Full name: Anja Müller-Schache
- Nationality: Germany
- Born: 29 March 1977 (age 49) Potsdam, Brandenburg, East Germany
- Height: 1.64 m (5 ft 5 in)
- Weight: 57 kg (126 lb)

Sport
- Sport: Fencing
- Event: Foil
- Club: FC Tauberbischofsheim
- Coached by: Ingo Weissborn
Medal record
Women's fencing
Representing Germany
World Championships
Bronze medal – third place	2009 Antalya	Team foil
European Championships
Bronze medal – third place	2011 Sheffield	Team foil

Anja Müller-Schache (born 29 March 1977) is a German foil fencer. She won a bronze medal, as a member of the German fencing team, at the 2009 World Fencing Championships in Antalya, Turkey.

Schache represented Germany at the 2008 Summer Olympics in Beijing, where she competed in two foil events. For her first event, the women's individual foil, Schache received a bye for the second preliminary round match, before losing out to Russia's Evgenia Lamonova, with a score of 2–15. Few days later, she joined with her fellow fencers and teammates Melanie Wolgast, Katja Wächter, and Carolin Golubytskyi for the women's team foil. Schache and her team, however, lost the fifth place match to the Chinese team (led by Zhang Lei), with a total score of 28 touches.
