= Giovanna Trillini =

Italian fencer (born 1970)

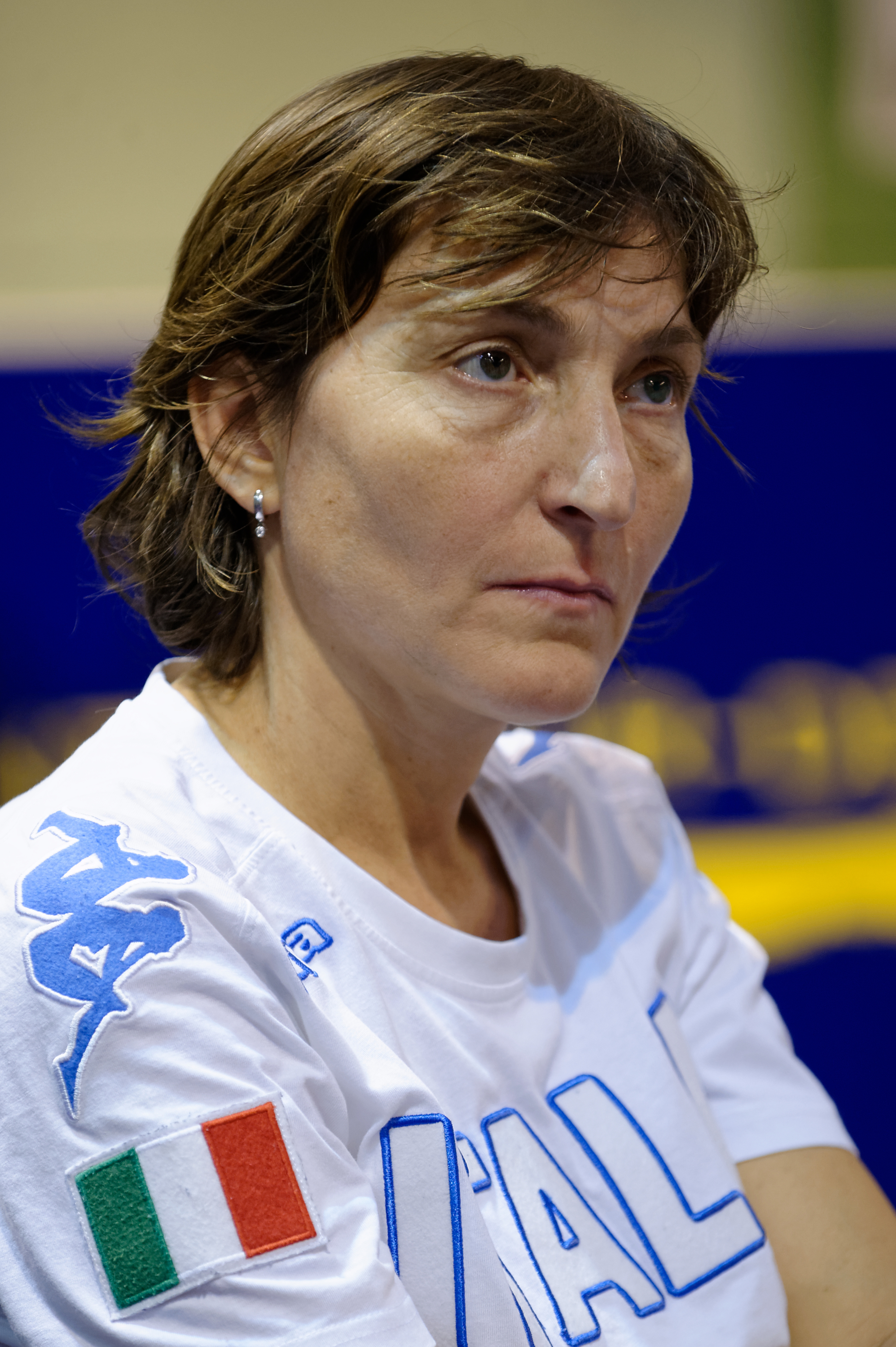
- Giovanna Trillini in 2015

Personal information
- Nationality: Italian
- Born: 17 May 1970 (age 56) Jesi, Italy
- Height: 1.64 m (5 ft 5 in)
- Weight: 69 kg (152 lb)

Fencing career
- Sport: Fencing
- Country: Italy
- Weapon: foil
- Hand: right-handed
- Club: G.S. Forestale/CS Jesi
Medal record
Olympic Games
Gold medal – first place	1992 Barcelona	Individual foil
Gold medal – first place	1992 Barcelona	Team foil
Gold medal – first place	1996 Atlanta	Team foil
Gold medal – first place	2000 Sydney	Team foil
Silver medal – second place	2004 Athens	Individual foil
Bronze medal – third place	1996 Atlanta	Individual foil
Bronze medal – third place	2000 Sydney	Individual foil
Bronze medal – third place	2008 Beijing	Team foil
World Championships
Gold medal – first place	1990 Lyon	Team foil
Gold medal – first place	1991 Budapest	Individual foil
Gold medal – first place	1991 Budapest	Team foil
Gold medal – first place	1995 The Hague	Team foil
Gold medal – first place	1997 Cape Town	Team foil
Gold medal – first place	1997 Cape Town	Team foil
Gold medal – first place	1998 La Chaux-de-Fonds	Team foil
Gold medal – first place	2001 Nîmes	Team foil
Gold medal – first place	2004 New York	Team foil
Silver medal – second place	1986 Sofia	Team foil
Silver medal – second place	1990 Lyon	Individual foil
Silver medal – second place	1994 Athens	Team foil
Silver medal – second place	1995 The Hague	Individual foil
Silver medal – second place	2006 Turin	Team foil
Bronze medal – third place	1987 Lausanne	Team foil
Bronze medal – third place	1989 Denver	Team foil
Bronze medal – third place	1993 Essen	Team foil
Bronze medal – third place	1998 La Chaux-de-Fonds	Individual foil
Bronze medal – third place	2006 Turin	Individual foil
Bronze medal – third place	2007 St. Petersburg	Individual foil
European Championships
Gold medal – first place	1999 Bolzano	Team foil
Gold medal – first place	2001 Koblenz	Team foil
Silver medal – second place	2001 Koblenz	Individual foil
Bronze medal – third place	1994 Krakow	Individual foil
Bronze medal – third place	1998 Plovdiv	Team foil
Bronze medal – third place	2007 Ghent	Team foil
Mediterranean Games
Gold medal – first place	1997 Bari	Individual foil
Silver medal – second place	1991 Athens	Individual foil
Silver medal – second place	1993 Languedoc	Individual foil
Summer Universiade
Gold medal – first place	1989 Duisburg	Team foil
Gold medal – first place	1991 Sheffield	Individual foil
Gold medal – first place	1991 Sheffield	Team foil
Gold medal – first place	1993 Buffalo	Team foil
Bronze medal – third place	1989 Duisburg	Individual foil
Bronze medal – third place	1993 Buffalo	Individual foil

Giovanna Trillini (born 17 May 1970) is an Italian foil fencer. She is a 4-time Olympic champion (3 times in the team event, 1 time individual) and won an additional silver and two bronze medals in individual Olympic competitions.

== Biography ==
She has two brothers, Ezio and Roberto, who were both fencers. In 2001, she got her degree in Sport Science at the University of Urbino.
Trillini won the bronze medal at the foil 2006 World Fencing Championships after she lost 15–8 to Margherita Granbassi in the semi-final. Later in the tournament she also won a silver in the team's foil event together with her teammates Elisa Di Francisca, Margherita Granbassi and Valentina Vezzali.

In 1998 she married Giovanni Battista Rotella. They have two children: Claudia, born on 12 September 2005 and Giovanni, born on 1 August 2009.

== Achievements ==
Olympic Games

- Foil individual (1992) and Foil team (1992, 1996, 2000)
- Foil individual (2004)
- Foil individual (1996, 2000) and Foil team (2008)

World Championships

- Foil individual (1991, 1997) and Foil team (1990, 1991, 1995, 1997, 1998, 2001, 2004)
- Foil individual (1990, 1995) and Foil team (1986, 1994, 2006)
- Foil individual (1989, 1998, 2006, 2007) and Foil team (1987)

European Championships

- Foil team (1999, 2000)
- Foil individual (2001)
- Foil individual (1994) and Foil team (1998, 2007)

Mediterranean Games

- Foil individual (1997)
- Foil individual (1991, 1993)

Fencing World Cup

- Foil (1991, 1994, 1995, 1998)

== Honours and awards ==
Italy: Grande Ufficiale Ordine al Merito della Repubblica Italiana (Italian for: Grand Officer Order of Merit of the Italian Republic), 1 September 2008

== See also ==
- Italian sportswomen multiple medalists at Olympics and World Championships
- Italy national fencing team – Multiple medallist
- List of multiple Summer Olympic medalists

Awards
Preceded by Annarita Sidoti	Italian Sportswoman of the Year; 1991-1992	Succeeded by Stefania Belmondo
Summer Olympics
Preceded by Giuseppe Abbagnale	Flag bearer for Italy; 1996 Atlanta	Succeeded by Carlton Myers
