= Jung Gil-ok =

South Korean fencer

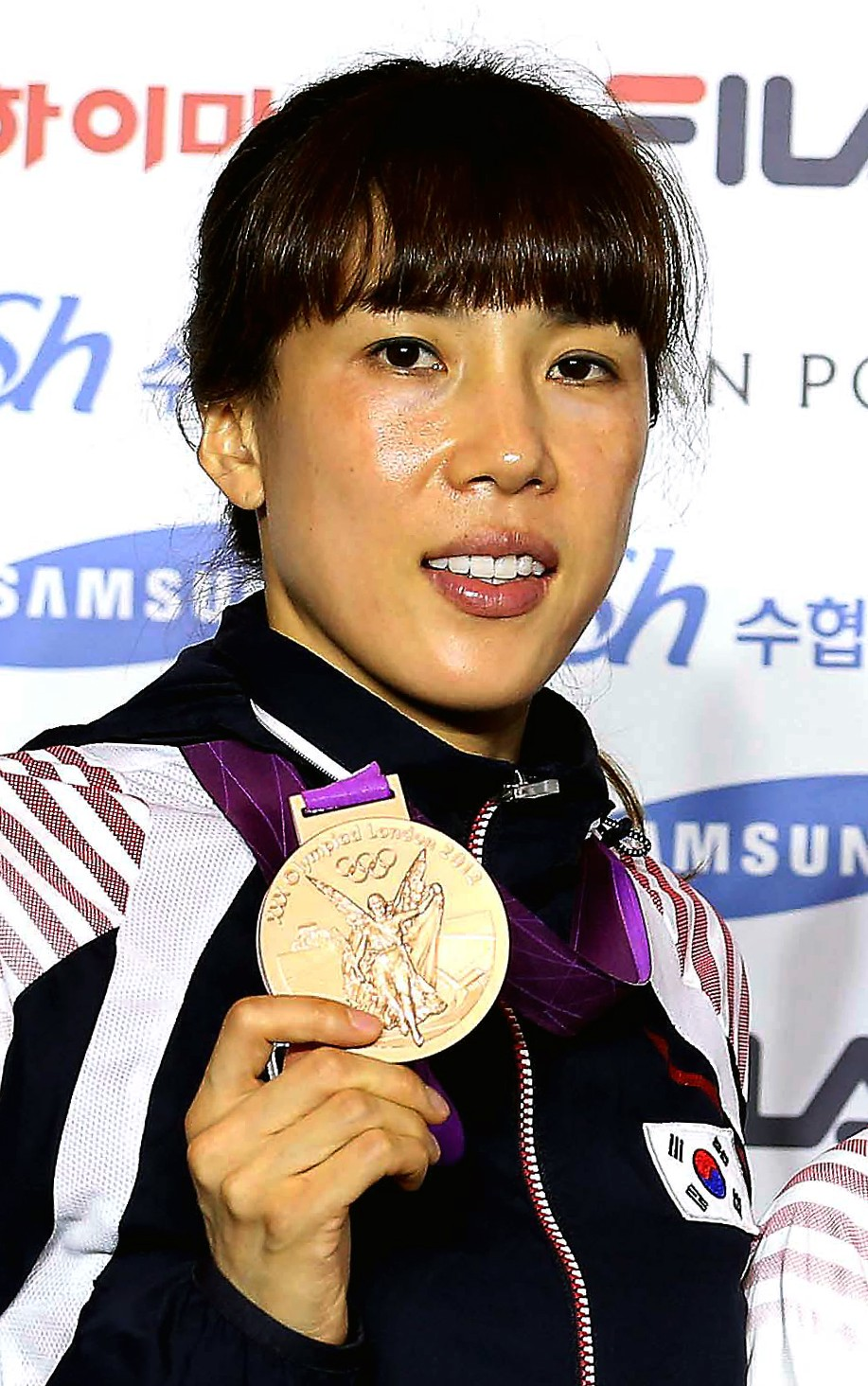

Personal information
- Born: 8 September 1980 (age 45) Chuncheon, Gangwon Province, South Korea
- Height: 1.67 m (5 ft 6 in)
- Weight: 56 kg (123 lb)

Fencing career
- Sport: Fencing
- Weapon: foil
- Hand: left-handed
- National coach: Lee Jung-woon
- Club: Gangwon Province
- FIE ranking: current ranking
Medal record
Women's Foil
Representing South Korea
Olympic Games
Bronze medal – third place	2012 London	Team foil
World Championships
Gold medal – first place	2005 Leipzig	Team foil
Bronze medal – third place	2006 Turin	Team foil
Bronze medal – third place	2011 Catania	Team foil

- Korean name
- Hangul: 정길옥
- RR: Jeong Gilok
- MR: Chŏng Kirok

Jung Gil-Ok (Korean: 정길옥; born 15 September 1980) is a South Korean foil fencer.

Jung won the bronze medal in the foil team event at the 2006 World Fencing Championships after beating Poland in the bronze medal match. She accomplished this with her teammates Jeon Hee-Sok, Seo Mi-Jung and Nam Hyun-Hee. She also competed in the 2008 Beijing Olympic Games, finishing in 24th position. She was part of the South Korean team that won the bronze in the women's team foil at the 2012 London Olympics, beating the French team in the bronze medal match.

== Achievements ==
2006 World Fencing Championships, team foil
