= Su Wanwen =

Chinese fencer

Su Wanwen (born 1982-10-02 in Guangzhou, Guangdong) is a female Chinese foil fencer, who competed at the 2008 Summer Olympics coming 16th.

== Major performances ==
- 2006 Asian Games - 2nd team
- 2007 World Cup Grand Prix Cuba - 2nd team
- 2008 Summer Olympics - 16th Place

== See also ==
- China at the 2008 Summer Olympics
