= Aida Mohamed =

Hungarian foil fencer

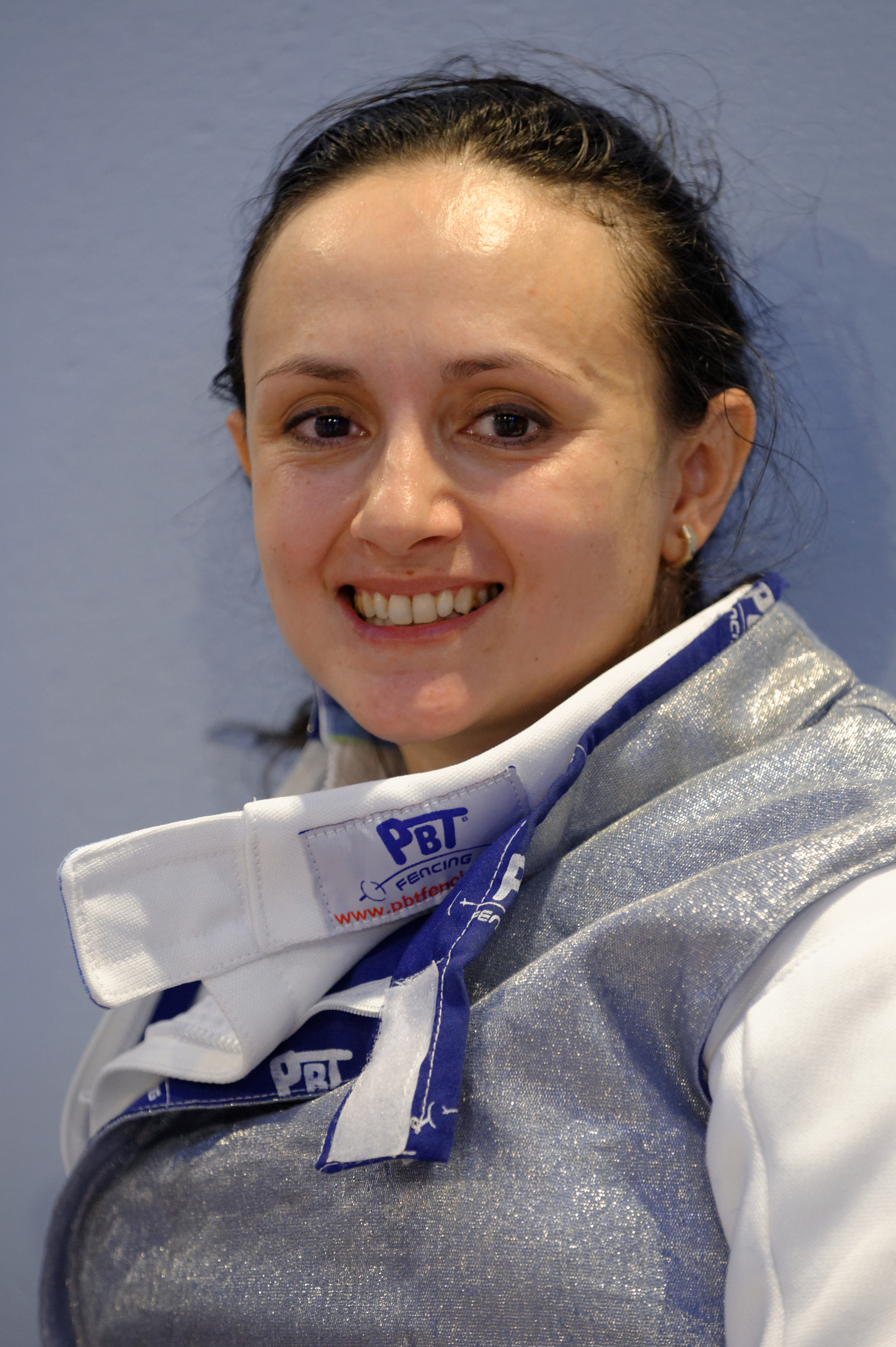
- Mohamed in 2014

Personal information
- Born: 12 March 1976 (age 50) Budapest, Hungary
- Height: 1.62 m (5 ft 4 in)
- Weight: 58 kg (128 lb)

Fencing career
- Sport: Fencing
- Weapon: Foil
- Hand: left-handed
- Club: MTK Budapest (1986–2009); Törekvés SE (2009-2013); Újpesti TE (2014–present)
- Head coach: Antal Solti
- FIE ranking: current ranking
Medal record
Women's foil fencing
Representing Hungary
World Championships
Silver medal – second place	1993 Essen	Individual
Bronze medal – third place	1994 Athens	Team
Bronze medal – third place	2002 Lisbon	Individual
Bronze medal – third place	2003 Havana	Individual
Bronze medal – third place	2007 Saint Petersburg	Individual
Bronze medal – third place	2006 Torino	Individual
European Championships
Gold medal – first place	2007 Ghent	Team
Silver medal – second place	1992 Lisbon	Individual
Silver medal – second place	2001 Koblenz	Team
Silver medal – second place	2002 Moscow	Team
Silver medal – second place	2008 Kyiv	Team
Bronze medal – third place	1999 Bolzano	Individual
Bronze medal – third place	2013 Zagreb	Team
Bronze medal – third place	2015 Montreux	Individual
Bronze medal – third place	2024 Basel	Team
Summer Universiade
Gold medal – first place	1997 Catania	Team
Silver medal – second place	1999 Palma de Mallorca	Individual

Aida Gabriella Mohamed (born 12 March 1976) is a Hungarian foil fencer, silver medallist at the 1993 World Championships and team gold medallist at the 2007 European Championships. She is the only Hungarian athlete in history to have competed at seven different Olympic Games (from 1996 to 2020).

== Career ==
Mohamed was born in Budapest from a Hungarian mother and a Syrian father. She was too shy in primary school to join the local fencing team, but her PE teacher persuaded her to give it a go. She then trained at the MTK sports club in Budapest with fencing master Antal Solti, who remained her personal coach as of 2013. She won in 1991 a bronze medal at the Cadet European Fencing Championships and the gold medal at the Junior World Championships. She retained her Junior title in 1992 and won it again in 1996.

At senior level she won her first major medal in 1992 with a silver medal at the 1992 European Championships, followed with another silver at the 1993 World Championships. She won the bronze medal at the foil 2006 World Fencing Championships after she lost 15–3 to Valentina Vezzali in the semi-finals.

Mohamed transferred to Törekvés SE in 2009 after 23 years at MTK, but continued training with Antal Solti.

== Personal life ==
She married in 2005 former Canadian Olympic pentathlete and épée fencer, Laurie Shong, whom she met at the 1999 Seoul World Cup. They have two daughters, Olívia, born in 2009, and Leila, born in 2014.

== Awards ==
- Hungarian Junior fencer of the Year (3): 1991, 1992, 1995
- Masterly youth athlete: 1992, 1993, 1994, 1995, 1996
- Hungarian Youth Athlete of the Year (1): 1992
- Hungarian Fencer of the Year (5): 1993, 2002, 2003, 2007, 2012

Orders and special awards

- Cross of Merit of the Republic of Hungary – Silver Cross (2004)
- Cross of Merit of the Republic of Hungary – Golden Cross (2008)

Olympic Games
Preceded by Áron Szilágyi	Flagbearer for Hungary (with László Cseh); Tokyo 2020	Succeeded by Blanka Bíró; Krisztián Tóth
