= Sun Chao (fencer) =

Chinese fencer

Sun Chao (born January 23, 1983, in Tianjin) is a female Chinese foil fencer, who competed at the 2008 Summer Olympics.

== Major performances ==
- 2007 World Cup Shanghai - 7th
- 2007 World Cup Grand Prix Cuba - 2nd team

== See also ==
- China at the 2008 Summer Olympics
