= Aida Shanayeva =

Russian fencer

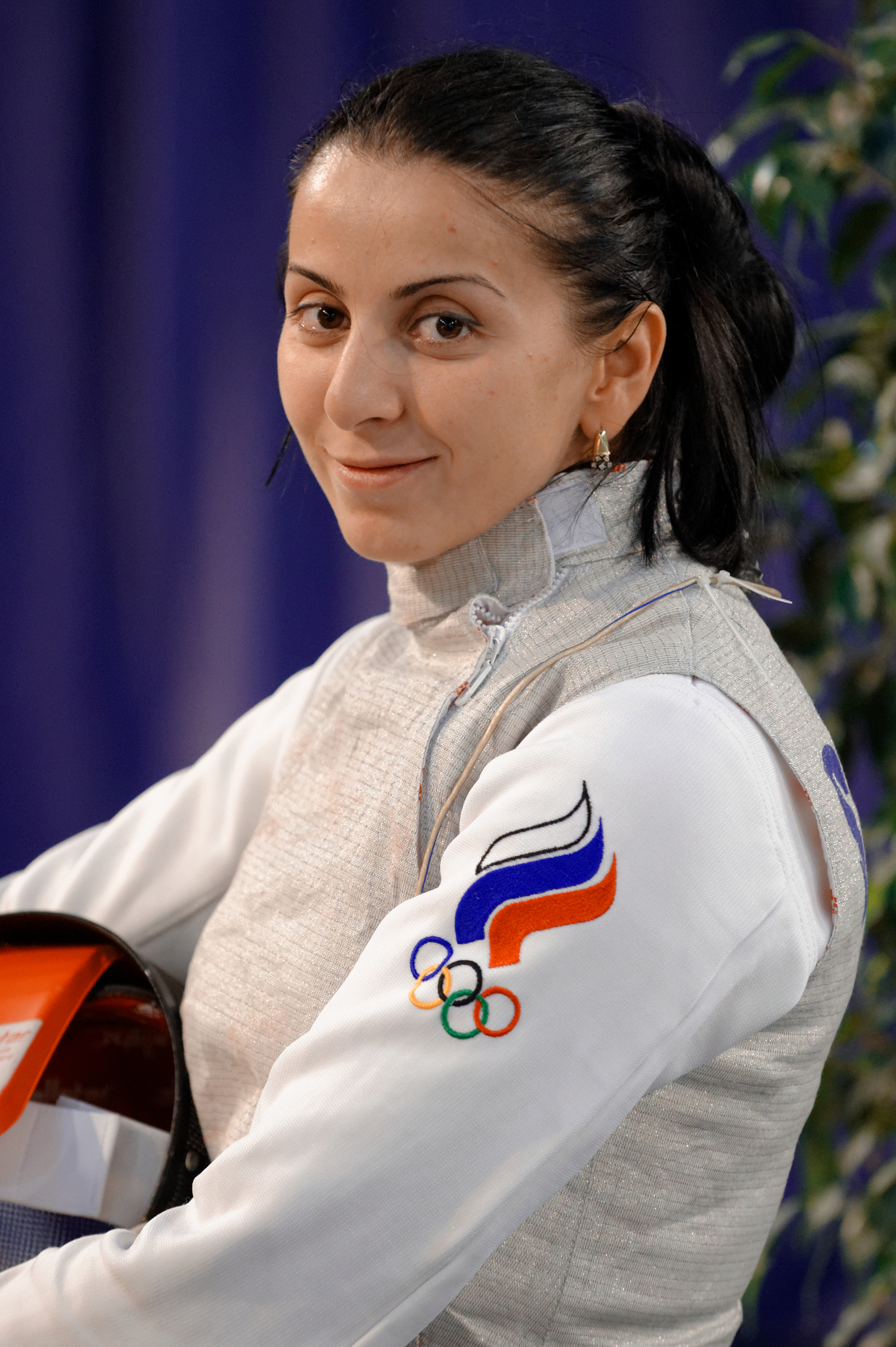

Personal information
- Full name: Aida Vladimirovna Shanayeva
- Nationality: Russian
- Born: 23 April 1986 (age 40) Vladikavkaz, NOASSR, RSFSR, Soviet Union
- Height: 1.73 m (5 ft 8 in)
- Weight: 62 kg (137 lb)

Fencing career
- Sport: Fencing
- Weapon: foil
- Hand: right-handed
- National coach: Stefano Cerioni
- Club: CSKA Moscow
- FIE ranking: current ranking
Medal record
Women's fencing
Representing Russia
Olympic Games
Gold medal – first place	2008 Beijing	Team foil
Silver medal – second place	2012 London	Team foil
World Championships
Gold medal – first place	2009 Antalya	Individual foil
Gold medal – first place	2006 Turin	Team foil
Gold medal – first place	2011 Catania	Team foil
Gold medal – first place	2016 Rio de Janeiro	Team foil
Silver medal – second place	2007 St. Petersburg	Team foil
Silver medal – second place	2009 Antalya	Team foil
Silver medal – second place	2015 Moscow	Individual foil
Silver medal – second place	2015 Moscow	Team foil
European Championships
Gold medal – first place	2009 İzmir	Team foil
Gold medal – first place	2016 Toruń	Team foil
Silver medal – second place	2007 Ghent	Team foil
Silver medal – second place	2009 Plovdiv	Team foil
Silver medal – second place	2011 Sheffield	Team foil
Silver medal – second place	2016 Toruń	Individual foil
Bronze medal – third place	2010 Leipzig	Team foil
Bronze medal – third place	2012 Legnano	Team foil

Aida Vladimirovna Shanayeva (Russian: Аида Владимировна Шанаева, Iron Ossetic: Санаты Владимиры чызг Аидæ; born 23 April 1986) is a Russian foil fencer, team Olympic champion at the 2008 Summer Olympics, World champion at 2009 World Fencing Championships and twice team World champion (2006 and 2011).

Shanayeva won the gold medal in the foil team event at the 2006 World Fencing Championships after beating USA in the final. She accomplished this with her teammates Svetlana Boyko, Julia Khakimova and Ianna Rouzavina.
