= Sylwia Gruchała =

Polish fencer (born 1981)

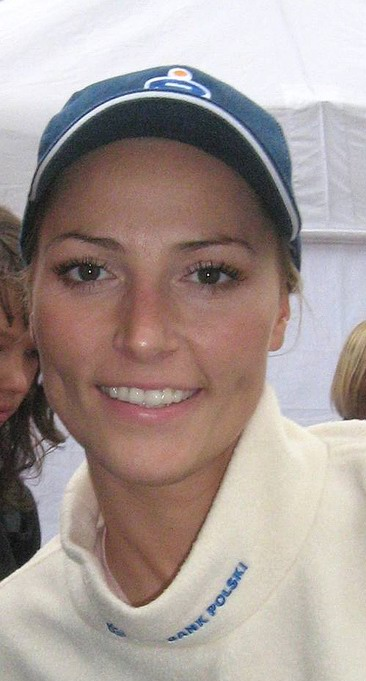

Personal information
- Born: 6 November 1981 (age 44) Gdynia, Poland

Sport
- Sport: Fencing
Medal record
Women's fencing
Representing Poland
Olympic Games
Silver medal – second place	2000 Sydney	Foil Team
Bronze medal – third place	2004 Athens	Foil Individual

Sylwia Gruchała (born 6 November 1981 in Gdynia, Pomorskie) is a Polish fencer.

== Biography ==
In the team foil she won medals at the world championships in 1998 (bronze), 1999 (silver), 2002 (silver), 2003 (gold) and 2007 (gold) as well as an Olympic silver medal in 2000. In Individual Foil she won a silver medal at the 2003 World Championship as well as an Olympic bronze medal in 2004.

She is a soldier in the 3rd Command Support Battalion of the Polish Land Forces stationed in Warsaw. Gruchała is also part of the Leon Paul team. In 2009, she posed for Polish erotic magazine CKM.

== Honours ==
For her sport achievements, she received:

Golden Cross of Merit in 2000;
Knight's Cross of the Order of Polonia Restituta (5th Class) in 2004.
