= Valentina Vezzali =

Italian fencer and politician

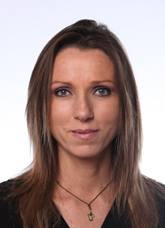

Member of the Italian Chamber of Deputies
- In office 19 March 2013 – 22 March 2018

Personal details
- Born: 14 February 1974 (age 52) Iesi, Marche, Italy
- Party: Civic Choice (2013–17); Independent (2017–22); Forza Italia (2022–present)
- Spouse: Domenico Giugliano
- Children: 2
- Profession: Agent of the Polizia di Stato
- Fencing career
- Full name: Maria Valentina Vezzali
- Nickname: Cobra
- Height: 1.64 m (5 ft 5 in)
- Weight: 53 kg (117 lb)
- Sport: Fencing
- Country: Italy
- Weapon: Foil
- Hand: right-handed
- National coach: Andrea Cipressa
- Club: G.S. Fiamme Oro
- FIE ranking: rankings
Medal record
Women's fencing
Representing Italy
Event	1st	2nd	3rd
Olympic Games	6	1	2
World Championships	16	6	4
European Championships	13	4	3
Universiade	5	3	0
Mediterranean Games	2	0	0
Total (65)	42	14	9
Olympic Games
Gold medal – first place	1996 Atlanta	Foil team
Gold medal – first place	2000 Sydney	Foil individual
Gold medal – first place	2000 Sydney	Foil team
Gold medal – first place	2004 Athens	Foil individual
Gold medal – first place	2008 Beijing	Foil individual
Gold medal – first place	2012 London	Foil team
Silver medal – second place	1996 Atlanta	Foil individual
Bronze medal – third place	2008 Beijing	Foil team
Bronze medal – third place	2012 London	Foil individual
World Championships
Gold medal – first place	1995 The Hague	Foil team
Gold medal – first place	1997 Cape Town	Foil team
Gold medal – first place	1998 Le Chaux-de-Fonds	Foil team
Gold medal – first place	1999 Seoul	Foil individual
Gold medal – first place	2001 Nimes	Foil individual
Gold medal – first place	2001 Nimes	Foil team
Gold medal – first place	2003 Havana	Foil individual
Gold medal – first place	2004 New York	Foil team
Gold medal – first place	2005 Leipzig	Foil individual
Gold medal – first place	2007 St. Petersburg	Foil individual
Gold medal – first place	2009 Antalya	Foil team
Gold medal – first place	2010 Paris	Foil team
Gold medal – first place	2011 Catania	Foil individual
Gold medal – first place	2013 Budapest	Foil team
Gold medal – first place	2014 Kazan	Foil team
Gold medal – first place	2015 Moscow	Foil team
Silver medal – second place	1994 Athens	Foil individual
Silver medal – second place	1994 Athens	Foil team
Silver medal – second place	2006 Turin	Foil individual
Silver medal – second place	2006 Turin	Foil team
Silver medal – second place	2011 Catania	Foil team
Silver medal – second place	2016 Rio de Janeiro	Foil team
Bronze medal – third place	1995 The Hague	Foil individual
Bronze medal – third place	1998 Le Chaux-de-Fonds	Foil individual
Bronze medal – third place	2010 Paris	Foil individual
Bronze medal – third place	2014 Kazan	Foil individual
European Championships
Gold medal – first place	13	(5 individual)
Silver medal – second place	4	(3 individual)
Bronze medal – third place	3	(2 individual)
Universiade
Gold medal – first place	5	(4 individual)
Silver medal – second place	3	(0 individual)
Bronze medal – third place	0	(0 individual)
Mediterranean Games
Gold medal – first place	2001 Tunis	Foil individual
Gold medal – first place	2009 Pescara	Foil individual

Maria Valentina Vezzali (Italian pronunciation: [valenˈtiːna vetˈtsaːli]; born 14 February 1974) is an Italian politician and retired Olympic and World Champion foil fencer. As a fencer, Vezzali won six Olympic gold medals and was a 16-time World Champion in foil. She is one of only five athletes in the history of the Summer Olympic Games to have won five medals in the same individual event. She is widely considered to be the greatest women's foilist in fencing history.

In 2013, Vezzali became a member of the Italian Chamber of Deputies as part of the Civic Choice party. In 2021, she became Italy's cabinet undersecretary in charge of sports.

== Fencing ==
As a child, she was first trained in fencing by her father, and then by the sword master Ezio Triccoli.

Vezzali was the first fencer in Olympic history to win three individual foil gold medals at three consecutive Olympics – Sydney 2000, Athens 2004 and Beijing 2008. Vezzali won nine Olympic medals in all: five in individual foil (three gold, one silver, one bronze) and four in team foil (three gold, one bronze). She medaled in all five of her Olympic appearances from 1996 to 2012; she attempted to qualify for Rio 2016 at the age of 41, but did not gain enough points. Vezzali has the fourth-most Olympic medals (9) of any Italian athlete and the most of any female summer Olympian from Italy, behind short-track speed skater Arianna Fontana (14), fencer Edoardo Mangiarotti (13) and cross-country skier Stefania Belmondo (10).

She also won sixteen gold medals at the World Fencing Championships, six in individual competitions (1999, 2001, 2003, 2005, 2007, 2011) and another ten in team competitions (1995, 1997, 1998, 2001, 2004, 2009, 2010, 2013, 2014, 2015), plus six silver medals (two individual, 1994 and 2006, and four with Italian team, in 1994, 2006, 2011, 2016) and four bronze medals (individual, 1995, 1998, 2012 and 2014).

In European championships, she won nine gold medals (individual: 1998, 1999, 2001, 2009, 2010; team: 1999, 2001, 2009, 2010), three silver medals (individual: 2003, 2007; team: 2007), two bronze medals (individual: 1993; team: 1998).

She was the official flag bearer of the 2012 Italy Olympic team in London.

In 2016, she came second at the Rio finals, failing to qualify for the next Olympics. She announced her retirement from fencing.

== Political career ==
Vezzali was a member of the Italian Parliament in the XVIIth Legislatura between 2013 and 2018. She was originally a member of the Civic Choice party led by Mario Monti. In 2021, she was named cabinet undersecretary in charge of sports for Italy. On 27 July 2022, Vezzali joined Silvio Berlusconi's Forza Italia (FI).

== Prize List ==
Event	Individual			Team			Total		
Event	Gold medal	Silver medal	Bronze medal	Gold medal	Silver medal	Bronze medal	Gold medal	Silver medal	Bronze medal
Olympics	3	1	1	3	0	1	6	1	2
World Championships	6	2	4	10	4	0	16	6	4
European Championships	5	3	2	8	1	2	13	4	3
Total	14	6	7	21	5	3	35	11	9

Fencing World Cup

- Foil (1996, 1997, 1999, 2000, 2001, 2002, 2003, 2004, 2007, 2008, 2010)

== Achievements ==
=== Olympic Games ===
Year	Competition	Venue	Position	Event
1996	Olympic Games	(United States) Atlanta	2nd	Foil individual
1996	Olympic Games	(United States) Atlanta	1st	Foil Team
2000	Olympic Games	(Australia) Sydney	1st	Foil individual
2000	Olympic Games	(Australia) Sydney	1st	Foil Team
2004	Olympic Games	(Greece) Athens	1st	Foil individual
2008	Olympic Games	(China) Beijing	1st	Foil individual
2008	Olympic Games	(China) Beijing	3rd	Foil Team
2012	Olympic Games	(United Kingdom) London	3rd	Foil individual
2012	Olympic Games	(United Kingdom) London	1st	Foil Team

=== World Championships ===
Season	Competition	Venue	Position	Event
1993	World Fencing Championships	(Germany) Essen	6th	Foil individual
1994	World Fencing Championships	(Greece) Athens	2nd	Foil individual
1994	World Fencing Championships	(Greece) Athens	2nd	Team Foil
1995	World Fencing Championships	(Netherlands) The Hague	3rd	Foil individual
1995	World Fencing Championships	(Netherlands) The Hague	1st	Team Foil
1997	World Fencing Championships	(South Africa) Cape Town	1st	Team Foil
1998	World Fencing Championships	(Switzerland) La Chaux-de-Fonds	3rd	Foil individual
1998	World Fencing Championships	(Switzerland) La Chaux-de-Fonds	1st	Team Foil
1999	World Fencing Championships	(South Korea) Seoul	1st	Foil individual
2001	World Fencing Championships	(France) Nimes	1st	Foil individual
2001	World Fencing Championships	(France) Nimes	1st	Team Foil
2003	World Fencing Championships	(Cuba) Havana	1st	Foil individual
2004	World Fencing Championships	(United States) New York	1st	Team Foil
2005	World Fencing Championships	(Germany) Leipzig	1st	Foil individual
2006	World Fencing Championships	(Italy) Turin	2nd	Foil individual
2006	World Fencing Championships	(Italy) Turin	2nd	Team Foil
2007	World Fencing Championships	(Russia) Saint Petersburg	1st	Foil individual
2009	World Fencing Championships	(Turkey) Antalya	5th	Foil individual
2009	World Fencing Championships	(Turkey) Antalya	1st	Team Foil
2010	World Fencing Championships	(France) Paris	3rd	Foil individual
2010	World Fencing Championships	(France) Paris	1st	Team Foil
2011	World Fencing Championships	(Italy) Catania	1st	Foil individual
2011	World Fencing Championships	(Italy) Catania	2nd	Team Foil
2013	World Fencing Championships	(Hungary) Budapest	1st	Team Foil
2014	World Fencing Championships	(Russia) Kazan	1st	Team Foil
2014	World Fencing Championships	(Russia) Kazan	3rd	Foil individual
2015	World Fencing Championships	(Russia) Moscow	1st	Team Foil
2016	World Fencing Championships	(Brazil) Rio de Janeiro	2nd	Team Foil

== Honors ==
- Italy: Grande Ufficiale Ordine al Merito della Repubblica Italiana (Italian for: Grand Officer Order of Merit of the Italian Republic), 1 September 2008.

== Publications ==
- Vezzali, Valentina; Luchetti, Caterina (2006). A viso scoperto [With uncovered face] (in Italian). Dalai Editore. ISBN 978-8866203551.
- Vezzali, Valentina; Carbone, Betta (2012). Io, Valentina Vezzali (in Italian). Milan: Dalai Editore. ISBN 978-88-6620-355-1.

== Personal life ==
She married Italian football player Domenico Giugliano and has two sons: Pietro, born on 9 June 2005, and Andrea, born on 16 May 2013. Vezzali is Catholic.

== See also ==
- Walk of Fame of Italian sport
- Multiple Olympic medalists | Multiple Olympic gold medalists | Multiple Summer Olympic medalists | Multiple Olympic medalists in one event

Awards
Preceded by Stefania Belmondo; Stefania Belmondo; Vanessa Ferrari	Italian Sportswoman of the Year; 2000–2001; 2003–2005; 2007	Succeeded by Stefania Belmondo; Vanessa Ferrari; Federica Pellegrini
Summer Olympics
Preceded by Antonio Rossi	Flag bearer for Italy; London 2012	Succeeded by Federica Pellegrini
