= Carolin Golubytskyi =

German fencer (born 1985)

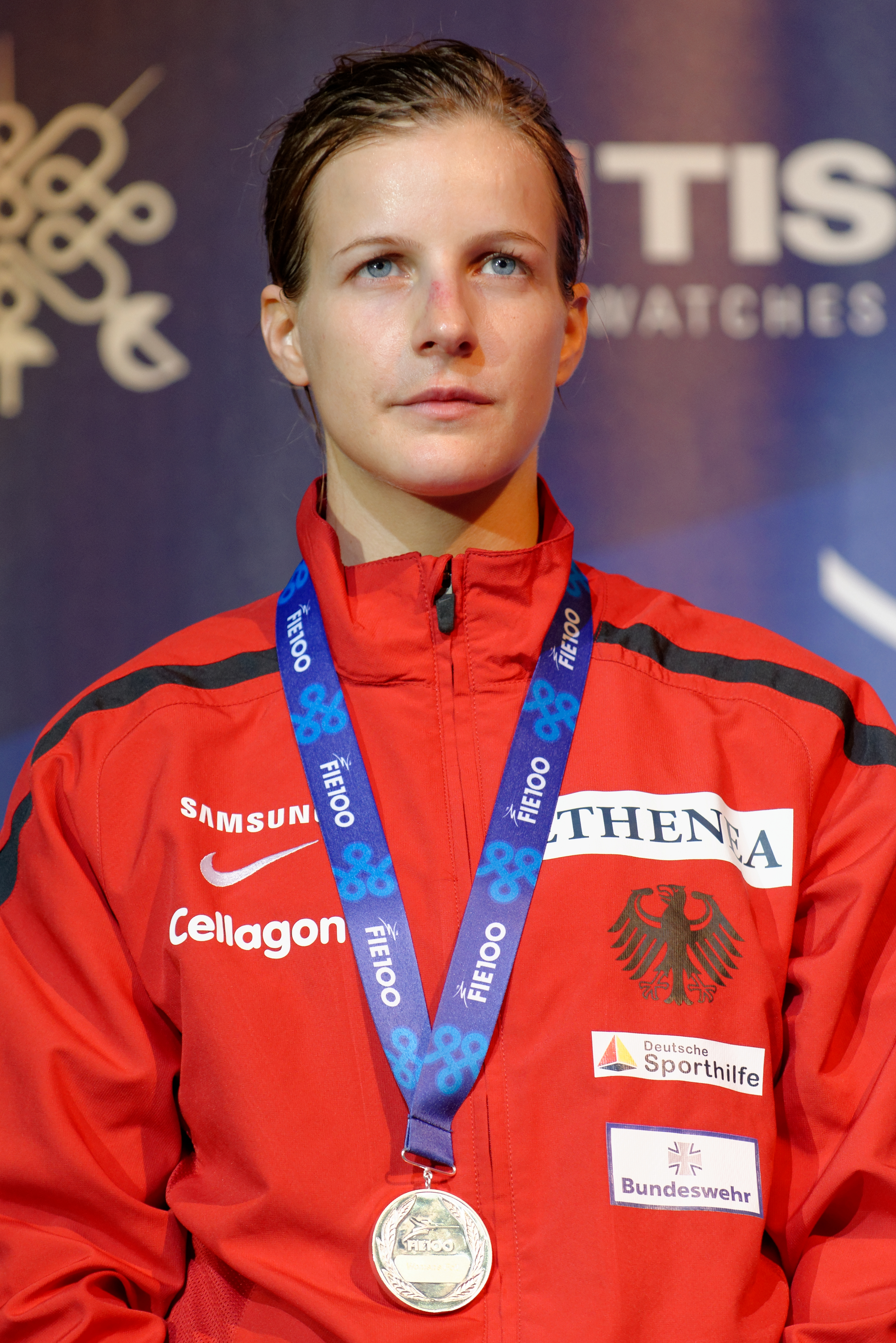
- At the 2013 World Fencing Championships

Personal information
- Full name: Carolin Elisabeth Bodoczi
- Born: Carolin Wutz; 19 December 1985 (age 40) Bad Mergentheim, Baden-Württemberg, West Germany
- Height: 1.66 m (5 ft 5 in)
- Weight: 55 kg (121 lb)

Fencing career
- Sport: Fencing
- Country: Germany
- Weapon: Foil
- Hand: right-handed
- National coach: Andrea Magro
- Club: FC Tauberbischofsheim
- Personal coach: Sergei Golubytskyi
- FIE ranking: current ranking
Medal record
Women's fencing
Representing Germany
World Championships
Silver medal – second place	2013 Budapest	Foil
Bronze medal – third place	2009 Antalya	Team Foil
European Championships
Silver medal – second place	2010 Leipzig	Team Foil
Bronze medal – third place	2008 Kyiv	Foil
Bronze medal – third place	2011 Sheffield	Team Foil
Bronze medal – third place	2013 Zagreb	Foil
Bronze medal – third place	2016 Torun	Foil
Bronze medal – third place	2017 Tbilisi	Team Foil

Carolin Elisabeth Bodoczi (née Wutz, born 19 December 1985 in Bad Mergentheim, Germany) is a German former foil fencer. She was married to Sergei Golubytskyi but is now married to Nikolaus Bodoczi, a German épéeist.

== Biography ==
Carolin Golubytskyi attended Riemenschneider-Realschule Tauberbischofsheim and the Kaufmännische Schule Tauberbischofsheim. Golubytskyi fought for the Fencing-Club Tauberbischofsheim. She was coached by her husband, Sergei Golubytskyi, a former world class fencer, 3 time consecutive World Champion, and Olympic silver medallist. Golubytskyi was part of the German team winning the bronze medal at the 2009 World Fencing Championships in Antalya, Turkey. She also won three medals at European Championships and participated in the 2008 Summer Olympics in Beijing.

She was nominated again to participate in the 2012 Summer Olympics in London. Golubytskyi won her first round bout against Colombian Saskia Garcia but was defeated in the round of 16 by Elisa Di Francisca of Italy, who would later win the gold medal. During the fight Di Francisca apparently hit Golubytskyi on the chin with the bell guard of her foil. After an interruption for several minutes, the German, who led the fight 8:6 at the time of the incident, was able to score only one further point and eventually lost 9:15.
