= 2007 World Fencing Championships =

Fencing event in St. Petersburg, Russia

2007 World Championships in Fencing
- Dates: September 28 – October 7
- Host city: Saint Petersburg, Russia

The 2007 World Fencing Championships were held at the SCC Peterburgsky in Saint Petersburg, Russia. The event took place from September 28 to October 7, 2007.

== Medal summary ==
=== Men's events ===
| Event | Gold | Silver | Bronze |
|---|---|---|---|
| Épée | (Hungary) Krisztián Kulcsár | (France) Érik Boisse | (Italy) Diego Confalonieri (France) Jérôme Jeannet |
| Foil | (Germany) Peter Joppich | (Italy) Andrea Baldini | (Germany) Benjamin Kleibrink (China) Lei Sheng |
| Sabre | (Russia) Stanislav Pozdnyakov | (Italy) Aldo Montano | (Germany) Nicolas Limbach (South Korea) Oh Eun-seok |
| Team Épée | France | Italy | Hungary |
| Team Foil | France | Germany | South Korea |
| Team Sabre | Hungary | France | Italy |

=== Women's events ===
| Event | Gold | Silver | Bronze |
|---|---|---|---|
| Épée | (Germany) Britta Heidemann | (China) Li Na | (France) Maureen Nisima (Estonia) Irina Embrich |
| Foil | (Italy) Valentina Vezzali | (Italy) Margherita Granbassi | (Italy) Giovanna Trillini (Hungary) Aida Mohamed |
| Sabre | (Russia) Yelena Nechayeva | (China) Tan Xue | (Poland) Bogna Jóźwiak (Italy) Gioia Marzocca |
| Team Épée | France | Russia | Germany |
| Team Foil | Poland | Russia | Japan |
| Team Sabre | France | Ukraine | Russia |

== Medal table ==
* Host nation (Russia)

| Rank | Nation | Gold | Silver | Bronze | Total |
|---|---|---|---|---|---|
| 1 | France (FRA) | 4 | 2 | 2 | 8 |
| 2 | Russia (RUS)* | 2 | 2 | 1 | 5 |
| 3 | Germany (GER) | 2 | 1 | 3 | 6 |
| 4 | Hungary (HUN) | 2 | 0 | 2 | 4 |
| 5 | Italy (ITA) | 1 | 4 | 4 | 9 |
| 6 | Poland (POL) | 1 | 0 | 1 | 2 |
| 7 | China (CHN) | 0 | 2 | 1 | 3 |
| 8 | Ukraine (UKR) | 0 | 1 | 0 | 1 |
| 9 | South Korea (KOR) | 0 | 0 | 2 | 2 |
| 10 | Estonia (EST) | 0 | 0 | 1 | 1 |
| 10 | Japan (JPN) | 0 | 0 | 1 | 1 |
| Totals (11 entries) | | 12 | 12 | 18 | 42 |

== Results overview ==
=== Men ===
==== Epée individual ====
3 October - Final

| Position | Name | Country |
|---|---|---|
| 1. | Krisztián Kulcsár | Hungary |
| 2. | Érik Boisse | France |
| 3. | Diego Confalonieri | Italy |
| 3. | Jérôme Jeannet | France |
| 5. | Silvio Fernández | Venezuela |
| 6. | Ulrich Robeiri | France |
| 7. | Maksym Khvorost | Ukraine |
| 8. | Dmytro Chumak | Ukraine |
| ... | | |
| 14. | Anton Avdeev | Russia |
| 20. | Igor Turchin | Russia |
| 24. | Aleksey Tikhomirov | Russia |
| 65. | Pavel Kolobkov | Russia |

Quarter-finals
(Ukraine) Maksym Khvorost | 8
(Hungary) Krisztián Kulcsár | 9
(Italy) Diego Confalonieri | 15
(France) Ulrich Robeiri | 13
(France) Érik Boisse | 15
(Venezuela) Silvio Fernández | 13
(France) Jérôme Jeannet | 15
(Ukraine) Dmytro Chumak | 12

Semi-finals
(Hungary) Krisztián Kulcsár | 15
(Italy) Diego Confalonieri | 14
(France) Érik Boisse | 15
(France) Jérôme Jeannet | 10

Final
(Hungary) Krisztián Kulcsár | 15
(France) Érik Boisse | 12

==== Epee team ====
7 October - Final

| Position | Country | Name |
|---|---|---|
| 1. | France | Érik Boisse; Fabrice Jeannet; Jérôme Jeannet; Ulrich Robeiri |
| 2. | Italy | Stefano Carozzo; Diego Confalonieri; Alfredo Rota; Matteo Tagliariol |
| 3. | Hungary | Gábor Boczkó; Géza Imre; Iván Kovács; Krisztián Kulcsár |
| 4. | Spain | José Luis Abajo; Ignacio Canto; Marc Font; Eduardo Sepulveda Puerto |
| 5. | Ukraine | Dmytro Karyuchenko; Maksym Khvorost; Vitaly Medvedev; Bohdan Nikishyn |
| 6. | Russia | Anton Avdeev; Pavel Kolobkov; Aleksey Tikhomirov; Igor Turchin |
| 7. | Poland | Krzysztof Mikołajczak; Tomasz Motyka; Adam Wiercioch; Radosław Zawrotniak |
| 8. | Venezuela | Silvio Fernández; Francisco Limardo; Rubén Limardo; Wolfgang Mejías |

Quarter-finals
France | 45
Russia | 33
Poland | 39
Spain | 45
Ukraine | 30
Italy | 31
Venezuela | 17
Hungary | 32

Semi-finals
France | 45
Spain | 40
Italy | 32
Hungary | 27

Final
France | 45
Italy | 38
Third place
Spain | 40
Hungary | 45

==== Foil individual ====
30 September - Final

| Position | Name | Country |
|---|---|---|
| 1. | Peter Joppich | Germany |
| 2. | Andrea Baldini | Italy |
| 3. | Benjamin Kleibrink | Germany |
| 3. | Lei Sheng | China |
| 5. | Erwann Le Péchoux | France |
| 6. | Salvatore Sanzo | Italy |
| 7. | Zhang Liangliang | China |
| 8. | Simone Vanni | Italy |
| ... | | |
| 20. | Renal Ganeyev | Russia |
| 26. | Andrey Deyev | Russia |
| 35. | Aleksey Cheremisinov | Russia |
| 55. | Youri Moltchan | Russia |

Quarter-finals
(Germany) Benjamin Kleibrink | 15
(China) Zhang Liangliang | 13
(Italy) Simone Vanni | 9
(Germany) Peter Joppich | 15
(France) Erwann Le Péchoux | 14
(China) Lei Sheng | 15
(Italy) Salvatore Sanzo | 12
(Italy) Andrea Baldini | 15

Semi-finals
(Germany) Benjamin Kleibrink | 4
(Germany) Peter Joppich | 15
(China) Lei Sheng | 10
(Italy) Andrea Baldini | 15

Final
(Germany) Peter Joppich | 15
(Italy) Andrea Baldini | 9

==== Foil team ====
5 October - Final

| Position | Country | Name |
|---|---|---|
| 1. | France | Nicolas Beaudan; Brice Guyart; Erwann Le Péchoux; Marcel Marcilloux |
| 2. | Germany | Dominik Behr; Peter Joppich; Benjamin Kleibrink; Christian Schlechtweg |
| 3. | South Korea | Choi Byung-chul; Jung Chang-yong; Park Hee-kyung; Son Young-ki |
| 4. | China | Huang Liangcai; Lei Sheng; Zhang Liangliang; Zhu Jun |
| 5. | Italy | Andrea Baldini; Stefano Barrera; Salvatore Sanzo; Simone Vanni |
| 6. | Poland | Radosław Glonek; Sławomir Mocek; Wojciech Szuchnicki; Marcin Zawada |
| 7. | Spain | Luis Caplliure; Gianmarco Cherubino; Gabriel Menendez; Javier Menendez |
| 8. | Israel | Oren Bassal; Maor Hatoel; Tomer Or |
| 9. | Russia | Aleksey Cheremisinov; Andrey Deyev; Renal Ganeyev; Aleksey Khovanskiy |

Quarter-finals
Germany | 45
Spain | 29
China | 45
Italy | 39
South Korea | 39
Israel | 38
Poland | 29
France | 45

Semi-finals
Germany | 45
China | 31
South Korea | 32
France | 45

Final
Germany | 32
France | 45
Third place
China | 42
South Korea | 43

==== Sabre individual ====
2 October - Final

| Position | Name | Country |
|---|---|---|
| 1. | Stanislav Pozdnyakov | Russia |
| 2. | Aldo Montano | Italy |
| 3. | Oh Eun-seok | South Korea |
| 3. | Nicolas Limbach | Germany |
| 5. | Mihai Covaliu | Romania |
| 6. | Boris Sanson | France |
| 7. | Vladimir Lukashenko | Ukraine |
| 8. | Jaime Martí | Spain |
| ... | | |
| 17 | Aleksey Yakimenko | Russia |
| 46 | Aleksey Frosin | Russia |
| 55 | Veniamin Reshetnikov | Russia |

Quarter-finals
(Russia) Stanislav Pozdnyakov | 15
(France) Boris Sanson | 14
(South Korea) Oh Eun-seok | 15
(Romania) Mihai Covaliu | 9
(Germany) Nicolas Limbach | 15
(Spain) Jaime Martí | 5
(Italy) Aldo Montano | 15
(Ukraine) Vladimir Lukashenko | 10

Semi-finals
(Russia) Stanislav Pozdnyakov | 15
(South Korea) Oh Eun-seok | 12
(Germany) Nicolas Limbach | 11
(Italy) Aldo Montano | 15

Final
(Russia) Stanislav Pozdnyakov | 15
(Italy) Aldo Montano | 11

==== Sabre team ====
6 October - Final

| Position | Country | Name |
|---|---|---|
| 1. | Hungary | Tamás Decsi; Balázs Lontay; Zsolt Nemcsik; Áron Szilágyi |
| 2. | France | Vincent Anstett; Nicolas Lopez; Julien Pillet; Boris Sanson |
| 3. | Italy | Aldo Montano; Diego Occhiuzzi; Gianpiero Pastore; Luigi Tarantino |
| 4. | Ukraine | Dmytro Boiko; Vladimir Lukashenko; Oleg Shturbabin; Vladislav Tretiak |
| 5. | Russia | Nikolay Kovalev; Stanislav Pozdnyakov; Veniamin Reshetnikov; Aleksey Yakimenko |
| 6. | Belarus | Aliaksandr Buikevich; Dmitri Lapkes; Valery Pryiemka; Aleksei Romanovitch |
| 7. | China | Jiang Kelü; Wang Jingzhi; Zhong Man; Zhou Hanming |
| 8. | Germany | Benedikt Beisheim; Max Hartung; Bjoern Huebner; Nicolas Limbach |

Quarter-finals
France | 45
China | 37
Italy | 45
Belarus | 39
Russia | 44
Hungary | 45
Germany | 39
Ukraine | 45

Semi-finals
France | 45
Italy | 29
Hungary | 45
Ukraine | 39

Final
France | 43
Hungary | 45
Third place
Italy | 45
Ukraine | 44

=== Women ===
==== Epée individual ====
1 October - Final

| Position | Name | Country |
|---|---|---|
| 1. | Britta Heidemann | Germany |
| 2. | Li Na | China |
| 3. | Maureen Nisima | France |
| 3. | Irina Embrich | Estonia |
| 5. | Eugenia Stroganova | Russia |
| 6. | Francesca Boscarelli | Italy |
| 7. | Loredana Iordăchioiu | Romania |
| 8. | Lyubov Shutova | Russia |
| 9. | Tatiana Logunova | Russia |
| ... | | |
| 12. | Anna Sivkova | Russia |

Quarter-finals
(Romania) Loredana Iordăchioiu | 5
(Germany) Britta Heidemann | 15
(Estonia) Irina Embrich | 15
(Russia) Eugenia Stroganova | 9
(China) Li Na | 15
(Italy) Francesca Boscarelli | 12
(Russia) Lyubov Shutova | 10
(France) Maureen Nisima | 11

Semi-finals
(Germany) Britta Heidemann | 15
(Estonia) Irina Embrich | 9
(China) Li Na | 8
(France) Maureen Nisima | 7

Final
(Germany) Britta Heidemann | 14
(China) Li Na | 10

==== Epée team ====
6 October - Final

| Position | Country | Name |
|---|---|---|
| 1. | France | Audrey Descouts; Laura Flessel-Colovic; Hajnalka Kiraly Picot; Maureen Nisima |
| 2. | Russia | Tatiana Logunova; Lyubov Shutova; Anna Sivkova; Eugenia Stroganova |
| 3. | Germany | Claudia Bokel; Imke Duplitzer; Britta Heidemann; Marijana Markovic |
| 4. | Estonia | Olga Aleksejeva; Irina Embrich; Kristina Kuusk; Maarika Vosu |
| 5. | Hungary | Adrienn Hormay; Ildikó Mincza-Nébald; Tímea Nagy; Emese Szász |
| 6. | Italy | Francesca Boscarelli; Cristiana Cascioli; Bianca Del Carretto; Nathalie Moellhausen |
| 7. | China | Li Na; Luo Xiaojuan; Zhang Li; Zhong Weiping |
| 8. | Poland | Malgorzata Bereza; Olga Cygan; Danuta Dmowska; Magdalena Grabowska |

Quarter-finals
China | 19
Russia | 30
Germany | 24
Hungary | 23
Estonia | 28
Italy | 27
Poland | 29
France | 45

Semi-finals
Russia | 30
Germany | 29
Estonia | 24
France | 28

Final
Russia | 37
France | 45
Third place
Germany | 42
Estonia | 40

==== Foil individual ====
4 October - Final

| Position | Name | Country |
|---|---|---|
| 1. | Valentina Vezzali | Italy |
| 2. | Margherita Granbassi | Italy |
| 3. | Giovanna Trillini | Italy |
| 3. | Aida Mohamed | Hungary |
| 5. | Nam Hyun-Hee | South Korea |
| 6. | Ilaria Salvatori | Italy |
| 7. | Edina Knapek | Hungary |
| 8. | Virginie Ujlaki | Hungary |
| ... | | |
| 10. | Ianna Rouzavina | Russia |
| 11. | Eugyenia Lamonova | Russia |
| 30. | Olga Lobyntseva | Russia |
| 46. | Aida Chanaeva | Russia |

Quarter-finals
(Italy) Margherita Granbassi | 15
(Hungary) Virginie Ujlaki | 10
(Hungary) Edina Knapek | 9
(Hungary) Aida Mohamed | 10
(Italy) Valentina Vezzali | 15
(Italy) Ilaria Salvatori | 7
(Italy) Giovanna Trillini | 15
(South Korea) Nam Hyun-Hee | 4

Semi-finals
(Italy) Margherita Granbassi | 14
(Hungary) Aida Mohamed | 13
(Italy) Valentina Vezzali | 15
(Italy) Giovanna Trillini | 6

Final
(Italy) Margherita Granbassi | 8
(Italy) Valentina Vezzali | 11

==== Foil team ====
7 October - Final

| Position | Country | Name |
|---|---|---|
| 1. | Poland | Sylwia Gruchała; Katarzyna Kryczalo; Magdalena Mroczkiewicz; Małgorzata Wojtkowiak |
| 2. | Russia | Aida Chanaeva; Julia Khakimova; Eugyenia Lamonova; Ianna Rouzavina |
| 3. | Japan | Kanae Ikehata; Maki Kawanishi; Yoko Makishita; Chieko Sugawara |
| 4. | Hungary | Edina Knapek; Aida Mohamed; Virginie Ujlaki; Gabriella Varga |
| 5. | Italy | Margherita Granbassi; Ilaria Salvatori; Giovanna Trillini; Valentina Vezzali |
| 6. | Romania | Roxana Scarlat; Cristina Ghiță; Cristina Stahl; Daniela Tanase |
| 7. | Germany | Sandra Bingenheimer; Carolin Golubytskyi; Anja Schache; Katja Waechter |
| 8. | China | Huang Jialing; Su Wan Wen; Sun Chao; Zhang Lei |

Quarter-finals
Italy | 16
Japan | 17
China | 42
Poland | 45
Hungary | 31
Germany | 30
Romania | 16
Russia | 39

Semi-finals
Japan | 21
Poland | 25
Hungary | 23
Russia | 29

Final
Poland | 26
Russia | 25
Third place
Japan | 33
Hungary | 31

==== Sabre individual ====
29 September - Final

| Position | Name | Country |
|---|---|---|
| 1. | Yelena Nechayeva | Russia |
| 2. | Tan Xue | China |
| 3. | Bogna Jóźwiak | Poland |
| 3. | Gioia Marzocca | Italy |
| 5. | Mariel Zagunis | United States |
| 6. | Sada Jacobson | United States |
| 7. | Sofiya Velikaya | Russia |
| 8. | Aleksandra Socha | Poland |
| 9. | Yekaterina Fedorkina | Russia |
| .... | | |
| 27. | Svetlana Kormilitsyna | Russia |

Quarter-finals
(China) Tan Xue | 15
(Russia) Sofiya Velikaya | 9
(Italy) Gioia Marzocca | 15
(United States) Sada Jacobson | 10
(United States) Mariel Zagunis | 14
(Poland) Bogna Jóźwiak | 15
(Russia) Yelena Nechayeva | 15
(Poland) Aleksandra Socha | 13

Semi-finals
(China) Tan Xue | 15
(Italy) Gioia Marzocca | 9
(Poland) Bogna Jóźwiak | 12
(Russia) Yelena Nechayeva | 15

Final
(China) Tan Xue | 12
(Russia) Yelena Nechayeva | 15

==== Sabre team ====
5 October - Final

| Position | Country | Name |
|---|---|---|
| 1. | France | Cécile Argiolas; Léonore Perrus; Anne-Lise Touya; Carole Vergne |
| 2. | Ukraine | Olha Kharlan; Olena Khomrova; Nina Kozlova; Halyna Pundyk |
| 3. | Russia | Yekaterina Fedorkina; Svetlana Kormilitsyna; Yelena Nechayeva; Sofiya Velikaya |
| 4. | Italy | Ilaria Bianco; Alessandra Lucchino; Gioia Marzocca; Irene Vecchi |
| 5. | China | Bao Yingying; Haiyang Huang; Tan Xue; Zhao Yuanyuan |
| 6. | Poland | Bogna Jóźwiak; Małgorzata Kozaczuk; Aleksandra Socha; Irena Więckowska |
| 7. | United States | Sada Jacobson; Rebecca Ward; Dagmara Wozniak; Mariel Zagunis |
| 8. | South Korea | An Mi-ae; Kim Hye-lim; Kim Keum-hwa; Lee Shin-mi |

Quarter-finals
United States | 42
Italy | 45
Ukraine | 45
China | 39
Russia | 45
Poland | 33
South Korea | 40
France | 45

Semi-finals
Italy | 38
Ukraine | 45
Russia | 40
France | 45

Final
Ukraine | 32
France | 45
Third place
Italy | 35
Russia | 45
