= 2006–07 Fencing World Cup =

International fencing competition

The 36th FIE Fencing World Cup began in October 2007 and concluded in September 2007 at the 2007 World Fencing Championships in Saint Petersburg, Russia.

== Individual Épée ==
Men
| 1 | Érik Boisse (FRA) | 266 |
| 2 | Gábor Boczkó (HUN) | 238 |
| 3 | Matteo Tagliariol (ITA) | 236 |
| 4 | Jérôme Jeannet (FRA) | 230 |
| 5 | Silvio Fernández (VEN) | 224 |
| 6 | Géza Imre (HUN) | 172 |
| 7 | Diego Confalonieri (ITA) | 168 |
| 8 | Ulrich Robeiri (FRA) | 164 |
| 9 | Seth Kelsey (USA) | 162 |
| 10 | Igor Turchin (RUS) | 160 |

Women
| 1 | Li Na (CHN) | 310 |
| 2 | Laura Flessel-Colovic (FRA) | 262 |
| 3 | Emese Szász (HUN) | 238 |
| 4 | Britta Heidemann (GER) | 236 |
| 5 | Hajnalka Kiraly (FRA) | 196 |
| 6 | Zhang Li (CHN) | 166 |
| 7 | Tatiana Logunova (RUS) | 164 |
| 8 | Ana Maria Brânză (ROU) | 162 |
| 9 | Zhong Weiping (CHN) | 154 |
| 10 | Claudia Bokel (GER) | 152 |

== Individual Foil ==
Men
| 1 | Andrea Baldini (ITA) | 334 |
| 2 | Benjamin Kleibrink (GER) | 318 |
| 3 | Erwann Le Péchoux (FRA) | 310 |
| 4 | Peter Joppich (GER) | 288 |
| 5 | Andrea Cassarà (ITA) | 270 |
| 6 | Lei Sheng (CHN) | 266 |
| 7 | Yuki Ota (JPN) | 264 |
| 8 | Salvatore Sanzo (ITA) | 262 |
| 9 | Simone Vanni (ITA) | 196 |
| 10 | Sławomir Mocek (POL) | 160 |

Women
| 1 | Valentina Vezzali (ITA) | 292 |
| 2 | Nam Hyun-hee (KOR) | 282 |
| 3 | Aida Mohamed (HUN) | 276 |
| 4 | Margherita Granbassi (ITA) | 270 |
| 5 | Ilaria Salvatori (ITA) | 258 |
| 6 | Cristina Stahl (ROU) | 216 |
| 7 | Giovanna Trillini (ITA) | 206 |
| 8 | Carolin Golubytskyi (GER) | 200 |
| 9 | Yevgeniya Lamonova (RUS) | 192 |
| 10 | Emily Cross (USA) | 176 |

== Individual Sabre ==
Men
| 1 | Aleksey Yakimenko (RUS) | 288 |
| 2 | Mihai Covaliu (ROU) | 284 |
| 3 | Stanislav Pozdnyakov (RUS) | 276 |
| 4 | Aldo Montano (ITA) | 244 |
| 5 | Nicolas Limbach (GER) | 208 |
| 6 | Wang Jingzhi (CHN) | 202 |
| 7 | Zsolt Nemcsik (HUN) | 202 |
| 8 | Boris Sanson (FRA) | 186 |
| 9 | Dmitry Lapkes (BLR) | 182 |
| 10 | Jorge Pina (ESP) | 180 |

Women
| 1 | Tan Xue (CHN) | 482 |
| 2 | Rebecca Ward (USA) | 310 |
| 3 | Mariel Zagunis (USA) | 286 |
| 4 | Yelena Nechayeva (RUS) | 262 |
| 5 | Gioia Marzocca (ITA) | 258 |
| 6 | Sada Jacobson (USA) | 244 |
| 7 | Sofiya Velikaya (RUS) | 216 |
| 8 | Ekaterina Fedorkina (RUS) | 212 |
| 9 | Bogna Jóźwiak (POL) | 198 |
| 10 | Aleksandra Socha (POL) | 156 |

== Team Épée ==
Men
| 1 | France | 368 |
| 2 | Hungary | 220 |
| 3 | Italy | 292 |
| 4 | Ukraine | 260 |
| 5 | Poland | 252 |
| 6 | Spain | 234 |
| 7 | Venezuela | 216 |
| 8 | Russia | 216 |
| 9 | United States | 198 |
| 10 | Germany | 198 |

Women
| 1 | France | 360 |
| 2 | China | 344 |
| 3 | Russia | 270 |
| 4 | Hungary | 259 |
| 5 | Italy | 246 |
| 6 | Germany | 240 |
| 7 | Romania | 235 |
| 8 | Poland | 231 |
| 9 | Canada | 208 |
| 10 | United States | 195 |

== Team Foil ==
Men
| 1 | Germany | 349 |
| 2 | France | 328 |
| 3 | China | 302 |
| 4 | Japan | 298 |
| 5 | Italy | 284 |
| 6 | Russia | 250 |
| 7 | Poland | 233 |
| 8 | United States | 202 |
| 9 | Spain | 188 |
| 10 | United Kingdom | 163 |

Women
| 1 | Russia | 344 |
| 2 | Italy | 336 |
| 3 | Poland | 322 |
| 4 | Hungary | 310 |
| 5 | China | 258 |
| 6 | Japan | 233 |
| 7 | United States | 232 |
| 8 | South Korea | 217 |
| 9 | Romania | 216 |
| 10 | Germany | 205 |

== Team Sabre ==
Men
| 1 | Hungary | 276 |
| 2 | France | 272 |
| 3 | Belarus | 268 |
| 4 | Russia | 253 |
| 5 | Italy | 248 |
| 6 | Ukraine | 242 |
| 7 | China | 222 |
| 8 | Germany | 208 |
| 9 | Romania | 197 |
| 10 | United States | 185 |

Women
| 1 | France | 362 |
| 2 | Ukraine | 334 |
| 3 | United States | 316 |
| 4 | Russia | 316 |
| 5 | China | 314 |
| 6 | Poland | 226 |
| 7 | Italy | 221 |
| 8 | South Korea | 216 |
| 9 | Hungary | 198 |
| 10 | Canada | 188 |
