= 2003 European Fencing Championships =

The 2003 European Fencing Championships were held in Bourges, France. The event took place from 29 June to 3 July 2003.

== Medal summary ==
=== Men's events ===
Event	Gold	Silver	Bronze
Foil	Simon Senft (GER)	João Gomes (POR)	Richard Breutner (GER); Jean-Noël Ferrari (FRA)
Épée	Gábor Boczkó (HUN)	Pavel Kolobkov (RUS)	Tomasz Motyka (POL); Hugues Obry (FRA)
Sabre	Stanislav Pozdnyakov (RUS)	Aleksey Yakimenko (RUS)	Boris Sanson (FRA); Luigi Tarantino (ITA)
Team Foil	France; Jean-Noël Ferrari; Erwann Le Péchoux; Antoine Mercier; Térence Joubert	Hungary; Attila Juhász; Adam Vizler; Bence Juhász; Mark Marsi	Russia; Vadim Ayupov; Vyacheslav Pozdnyakov; Ruslan Nasibulin; Aleksandr Stukalin
Team Épée	France; Hugues Obry; Gauthier Grumier; Benoît Janvier; Jean-Michel Lucenay	Ukraine; Dmytro Karyuchenko; Dmytro Chumak; Vitaliy Osharov; Oleksandr Horbachuk	Italy; Davide Schaier; Alessandro Bossalini; Diego Confalonieri; Giacomo Falcini
Team Sabre	Russia; Aleksey Frosin; Aleksey Dyachenko; Stanislav Pozdniakov; Aleksey Yakimenko	Italy; Luigi Tarantino; Aldo Montano; Giampiero Pastore; Giacomo Guidi	Poland; Marcin Koniusz; Arkadiusz Nowinowski; Adam Skrodzki; Maciej Tomczak

=== Women's events ===
Event	Gold	Silver	Bronze
Foil	Gabriella Varga (HUN)	Valentina Vezzali (ITA)	Svetlana Boyko (RUS); Yekaterina Yusheva (RUS)
Épée	Tatiana Logunova (RUS)	Maarika Võsu (EST)	Claire Augros (FRA); Ildikó Mincza-Nébald (HUN)
Sabre	Ilaria Bianco (ITA)	Natalia Makeeva (RUS)	Edina Csaba (HUN); Yelena Nechayeva (RUS)
Team Foil	Poland; Sylwia Gruchała; Magdalena Mroczkiewicz; Anna Rybicka; Małgorzata Wojtkowiak	Italy; Valentina Vezzali; Margherita Granbassi; Ilaria Salvatori; Frida Scarpa	Russia; Svetlana Bojko; Yekaterina Yusheva; Yevgeniya Lamonova; Viktoria Nikishina
Team Épée	Russia; Tatiana Logunova; Oksana Yermakova; Anna Sivkova; Tatyana Fakhrutdinova	Estonia; Maarika Võsu; Heidi Rohi; Olga Aleksejeva; Irina Embrich	Italy; Silvia Rinaldi; Sara Cristina Cometti; Bianca Del Carretto; Francesca Quondamcarlo
Team Sabre	Russia; Natalia Makeeva; Yelena Nechayeva; Yekaterina Fedorkina; Sofiya Velikaya	France; Cécile Argiolas; Léonore Perrus; Pascale Vignaux; Anne-Lise Touya	Azerbaijan; Yelena Jemayeva; Yana Siukayeva; Yelena Amirova; Anzhela Volkova

=== Medal table ===
Rank	Nation	Gold	Silver	Bronze	Total
1	Russia	5	3	5	13
2	France	2	1	4	7
3	Hungary	2	1	2	5
4	Italy	1	3	3	7
5	Poland	1	0	2	3
6	Germany	1	0	1	2
7	Estonia	0	2	0	2
8	Portugal	0	1	0	1
8	Ukraine	0	1	0	1
10	Azerbaijan	0	0	1	1
Totals (10 entries)		12	12	18	42
