= 2006 European Fencing Championships =

International fencing competition

European Seniors Fencing 2006 Izmir logo

The 2006 European Seniors Fencing Championship was held in İzmir, Turkey, between 4 July and 9 July 2006. The event, sanctioned by the European Fencing Confederation (EFC), was organized by the Turkish Fencing Federation (TEF). 382 senior fencers from 37 European countries competed in the championship's foil, épée, and sabre events. Russia was the most successful nation, followed by Hungary and Romania. This was the first time that the championship was hosted by Turkey.

== Venue ==
İzmir is the third largest city of Turkey. The competitions took place in Halkapınar Sport Hall, a multi-purpose hall with a capacity of around 9,000 persons, completed in 2005.

== Medal summary ==
=== Men's events ===
Event	Gold	Silver	Bronze
Foil	Ralf Bißdorf (GER)	Richard Kruse (GBR)	Brice Guyart (FRA); Benjamin Kleibrink (GER)
Épée	Iván Kovács (HUN)	Bastien Sicot (FRA)	Alfredo Rota (ITA); Pavel Kolobkov (RUS)
Sabre	Aleksey Yakimenko (RUS)	Volodymyr Lukashenko (UKR)	Julien Pillet (FRA); Florin Zalomir (ROU)
Team foil	France; Sébastien Coutant; Brice Guyart; Grégory Koenig; Térence Joubert	Poland; Wojciech Szuchnicki; Radosław Glonek; Sławomir Mocek; Michał Majewski	Russia; Andrey Deyev; Youri Moltchan; Sergey Tikhonov; Dmitriy Petrov
Team épée	Hungary; Gábor Boczkó; Iván Kovács; Géza Imre; Attila Fekete	Poland; Robert Andrzejuk; Krzysztof Mikołajczak; Tomasz Motyka; Adam Wiercioch	Italy; Stefano Carozzo; Alfredo Rota; Paolo Milanoli; Diego Confalonieri
Team sabre	Romania; Mihai Covaliu; Rareș Dumitrescu; Constantin Sandu; Florin Zalomir	Hungary; Zsolt Nemcsik; Tamás Decsi; Balázs Lengyel; Balázs Lontay	Russia; Aleksey Yakimenko; Aleksey Frosin; Stanislav Pozdnyakov; Nikolay Kovalev

=== Women's events ===
Event	Gold	Silver	Bronze
Foil	Ianna Rouzavina (RUS)	Elisa Di Francisca (ITA)	Claudia Pigliapoco (ITA); Anna Rybicka (POL)
Épée	Claudia Bokel (GER)	Tatiana Logunova (RUS)	Nadiya Kazimirchuk (UKR); Anca Măroiu (ROU)
Sabre	Sofiya Velikaya (RUS)	Olha Kharlan (UKR)	Ilaria Bianco (ITA); Bogna Jóźwiak (POL)
Team foil	Russia; Svetlana Boyko; Julia Khakimova; Ianna Rouzavina; Aida Shanayeva	Romania; Roxana Scarlat; Cristina Ghiță; Cristina Stahl	Poland; Karolina Chlewińska; Sylwia Gruchała; Magdalena Mroczkiewicz; Anna Rybicka
Team épée	Romania; Ana Maria Brânză; Loredana Iordăchioiu; Iuliana Măceșeanu; Anca Măroiu	Hungary; Adrienn Hormay; Tímea Nagy; Emese Szász; Hajnalka Toth	Germany; Claudia Bokel; Imke Duplitzer; Britta Heidemann; Marijana Markovic
Team sabre	Russia; Sofiya Velikaya; Yekaterina Fedorkina; Yekaterina Dyachenko; Yelena Nechayeva	Poland; Bogna Jóźwiak; Aleksandra Socha; Irena Więckowska; Lidia Sołtys	France; Anne-Lise Touya; Solenne Mary; Léonore Perrus; Cécile Argiolas

=== Medal table ===
Rank	Nation	Gold	Silver	Bronze	Total
1	Russia	5	1	3	9
2	Hungary	2	2	0	4
3	Romania	2	1	2	5
4	Germany	2	0	2	4
5	France	1	1	3	5
6	Poland	0	3	3	6
7	Ukraine	0	2	1	3
8	Italy	0	1	4	5
9	Great Britain	0	1	0	1
Totals (9 entries)		12	12	18	42

== Results ==
=== Men ===
==== Individual foil ====
Semi-finals
(United Kingdom) Richard Kruse	15
(France) Brice Guyart	11
(Germany) Ralf Bißdorf	15
(Germany) Benjamin Kleibrink	13

Final
(Germany) Ralf Bißdorf	15
(United Kingdom) Richard Kruse	7

==== Individual épée ====
Semi-finals
(France) Bastien Sicot	15
(Russia) Pavel Kolobkov	5
(Hungary) Iván Kovács	15
(Italy) Alfredo Rota	9

Final
(France) Bastien Sicot	8
(Hungary) Iván Kovács	15

==== Individual sabre ====
Semi-finals
(Ukraine) Volodymyr Lukashenko	15
(France) Julien Pillet	11
(Russia) Aleksey Yakimenko	15
(Romania) Florin Zalomir	14

Final
(Ukraine) Volodymyr Lukashenko	11
(Russia) Aleksey Yakimenko	15

=== Women ===
==== Individual foil ====
Semi-finals
(Russia) Ianna Rouzavina	14
(Poland) Anna Rybicka	8
(Italy) Elisa Di Francisca	10
(Italy) Claudia Pigliapoco	9

Final
(Russia) Ianna Rouzavina	15
(Italy) Elisa Di Francisca	10

==== Individual épée ====
Semi-finals
(Germany) Claudia Bokel	15
(Romania) Anca Măroiu	8
(Ukraine) Nadiya Kazimirchuk	13
(Russia) Tatiana Logunova	14

Final
(Germany) Claudia Bokel	11
(Russia) Tatiana Logunova	10

==== Individual sabre ====
Semi-finals
(Russia) Sofiya Velikaya	15
(Italy) Ilaria Bianco	4
(Ukraine) Olha Kharlan	15
(Poland) Bogna Jóźwiak	14

Final
(Russia) Sofiya Velikaya	15
(Ukraine) Olha Kharlan	14
