= 2004 World Fencing Championships =

International fencing competition

2004 World Championships in Fencing
- Dates: June 11
- Host city: (United States) New York City, USA

The 2004 World Fencing Championships were held at the Hunter College in New York City, USA. The event took place on 11 June 2004. It had women's team foil and women's team sabre, both of which were not held at the 2004 Summer Olympics.

== Medal summary ==
Event	Gold	Silver	Bronze
Women's Team Foil	Italy; Margherita Granbassi; Giovanna Trillini; Valentina Vezzali; Elisa Di Francisca	Romania; Roxana Scarlat; Laura Badea; Cristina Stahl	Poland; Sylwia Gruchała; Magdalena Mroczkiewicz; Anna Rybicka; Małgorzata Wojtkowiak
Women's Team Sabre	Russia; Sofiya Velikaya; Yekaterina Fedorkina; Yelena Nechayeva; Svetlana Kormilitsyna	USA; Emma Baratta; Emily Jacobson; Sada Jacobson; Mariel Zagunis	France; Anne-Lise Touya; Léonore Perrus; Cécile Argiolas

== Medal table ==
* Host nation (United States)

Rank	Nation	Gold	Silver	Bronze	Total
1	Italy (ITA)	1	0	0	1
1	Russia (RUS)	1	0	0	1
3	Romania (ROM)	0	1	0	1
3	United States (USA)*	0	1	0	1
5	France (FRA)	0	0	1	1
5	Poland (POL)	0	0	1	1
Totals (6 entries)		2	2	2	6

== See also ==
- Fencing at the 2004 Summer Olympics
