= Svetlana Kormilitsyna =

Russian fencer (born 1984)

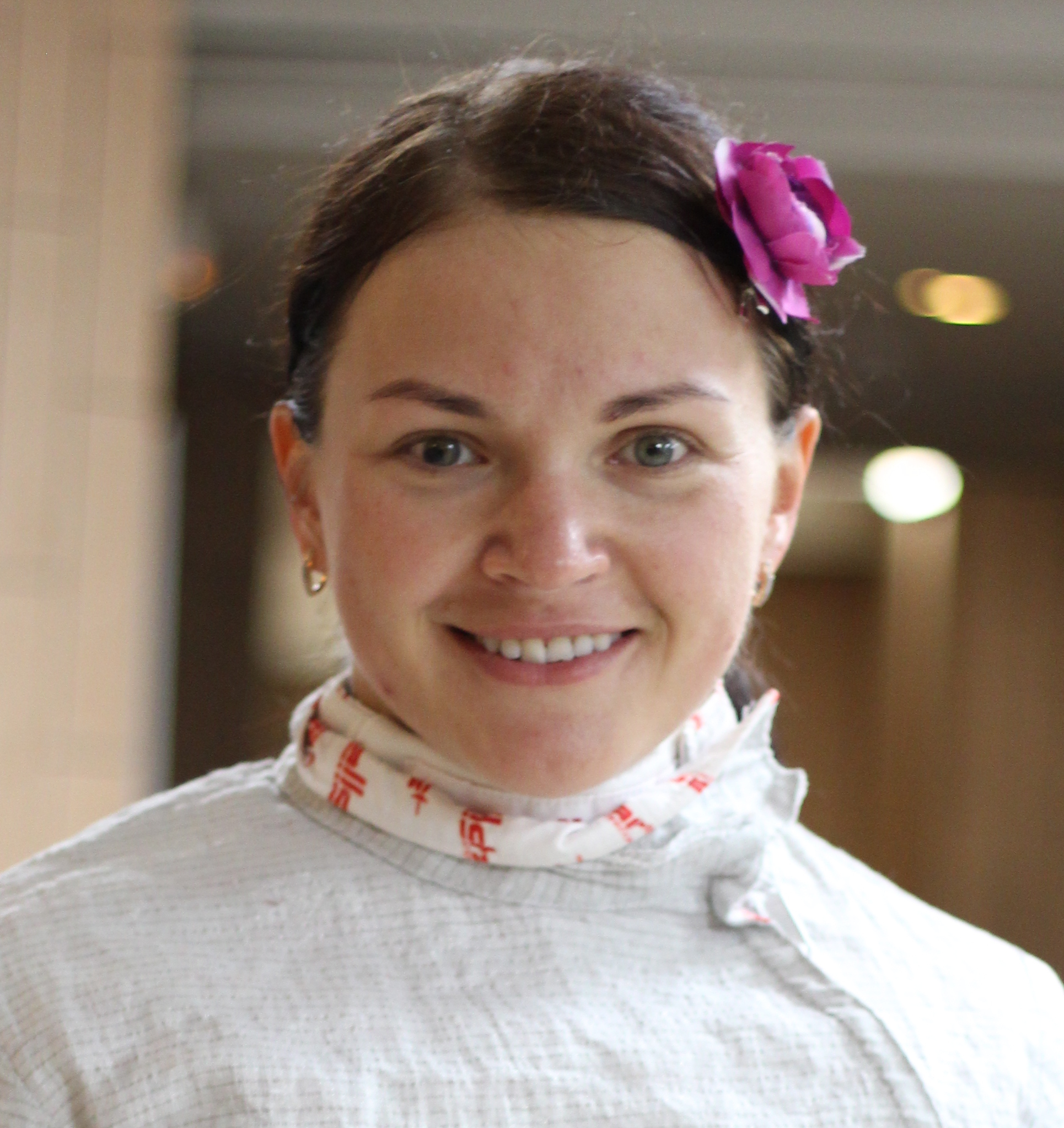

Personal information
- Native name: Светлана Анатольевна Кормилицына
- Full name: Svetlana Anatolyevna Kormilitsyna
- Nationality: Russian
- Born: 11 August 1984 (age 41) Kaluga, RSFSR, USSR
- Home town: Kaluga
- Height: 1.68 m (5 ft 6 in)
- Weight: 71 kg (157 lb)

Fencing career
- Sport: Fencing
- Country: Russia
- Weapon: Foil
- Hand: Right-handed
- Club: CSKA Moscow
- Head coach: Sergey Syomin; Dmitry Glotov
- FIE ranking: current ranking
Medal record
World Championships
Gold medal – first place	2004 New York	Team sabre
Gold medal – first place	2010 Paris	Team sabre
Silver medal – second place	2005 Leipzig	Team sabre
Bronze medal – third place	2007 Saint Petersburg	Team sabre
European Championships
Gold medal – first place	2004 Copenhagen	Team sabre
Gold medal – first place	2010 Leipzig	Individual sabre
Silver medal – second place	2005 Zalaegerszeg	Team sabre
Silver medal – second place	2009 Plovdiv	Team sabre
Silver medal – second place	2010 Leipzig	Team sabre
Bronze medal – third place	2007 Ghent	Team sabre

Svetlana Anatolevna Verteletskaya (née Kormilitsyna, Russian: Светла́на Анато́льевна Вертелецкая (дев. Корми́лицына); born 11 August 1984 in Kaluga) is a Russian fencer specializing in sabers. She is a two-time world and European champion and holds the title of Honored Master of Sports of Russia.

Verteletskaya has a higher pedagogical education, having graduated from Kaluga State University. She is not married and has a daughter named Ksenia. In her spare time she enjoys writing poetry.
