= 2005 World Fencing Championships =

International fencing competition

2005 World Championships in Fencing
- Dates: 9-10 October
- Host city: Leipzig, Germany

The 2005 World Fencing Championships were held in Leipzig, Germany from 9 October to 10 October 2005.

== Medal summary ==
=== Men's events ===
Event	Gold	Silver	Bronze
Épée	Pavel Kolobkov (RUS)	Fabrice Jeannet (FRA)	Bas Verwijlen (NED); Claus Mørch (NOR)
Foil	Salvatore Sanzo (ITA)	Zhang Liangliang (CHN)	Andrei Deev (RUS); Nicolas Beaudan (FRA)
Sabre	Mihai Covaliu (ROU)	Stanislav Pozdnyakov (RUS)	Oleh Shturbabin (UKR); Aleksey Yakimenko (RUS)
Team Épée	France; Érik Boisse; Ulrich Robeiri; Fabrice Jeannet; Jérôme Jeannet	Germany; Daniel Strigel; Martin Schmitt; Sven Schmid; Jörg Fiedler	Ukraine; Dmytro Chumak; Dmitriy Karuchenko; Maksym Khvorost; Vitaly Osharov
Team Foil	France; Victor Sintès; Nicolas Beaudan; Erwann Le Péchoux; Brice Guyart	Italy; Andrea Baldini; Andrea Cassarà; Salvatore Sanzo; Simone Vanni	Germany; Dominik Behr; Ralf Bissdorf; Peter Joppich; Benjamin Kleibrink
Team Sabre	Russia; Aleksey Dyachenko; Aleksey Frosin; Stanislav Pozdnyakov; Aleksey Yakimenko	Italy; Andrea Aquili; Aldo Montano; Gianpiero Pastore; Luigi Tarantino	France; Vincent Anstett; Nicolas Lopez; Julien Pillet; Boris Sanson

=== Women's events ===
Event	Gold	Silver	Bronze
Épée	Danuta Dmowska (POL)	Maarika Võsu (EST)	Laura Flessel-Colovic (FRA); Sherraine Mackay (CAN)
Foil	Valentina Vezzali (ITA)	Anja Müller (GER)	Adeline Wuillème (FRA); Edina Knapek (HUN)
Sabre	Anne-Lise Touya (FRA)	Sofiya Velikaya (RUS)	Alessandra Lucchino (ITA); Ilaria Bianco (ITA)
Team Épée	France; Sarah Daninthe; Laura Flessel-Colovic; Hajnalka Kiraly Picot; Maureen Nisima	Hungary; Julianna Révész; Emese Szász; Hajnalka Toth; Adrienn Hormay	Germany; Monika Sozanska; Imke Duplitzer; Britta Heidemann; Claudia Bokel
Team Foil	South Korea; Lee Hyun-sun; Jung Gil-ok; Nam Hyun-hee; Seo Mi-jung	Romania; Andreea Andrei; Cristina Ghiță; Roxana Scarlat; Cristina Stahl	France; Corinne Maîtrejean; Astrid Guyart; Céline Seigneur; Adeline Wuillème
Team Sabre	United States; Sada Jacobson; Caitlin Thompson; Rebecca Ward; Mariel Zagunis	Russia; Sofiya Velikaya; Ekaterina Fedorkina; Yelena Nechayeva; Svetlana Kormilitsyna	Hungary; Edina Csaba; Orsolya Nagy; Dora Varga; Gabriella Sznopek

== Medal table ==
* Host nation (Germany)

Rank	Nation	Gold	Silver	Bronze	Total
1	France (FRA)	4	1	5	10
2	Russia (RUS)	2	3	2	7
3	Italy (ITA)	2	2	2	6
4	Romania (ROM)	1	1	0	2
5	Poland (POL)	1	0	0	1
5	South Korea (KOR)	1	0	0	1
5	United States (USA)	1	0	0	1
8	Germany (GER)*	0	2	2	4
9	Hungary (HUN)	0	1	2	3
10	China (CHN)	0	1	0	1
10	Estonia (EST)	0	1	0	1
12	Ukraine (UKR)	0	0	2	2
13	Canada (CAN)	0	0	1	1
13	Netherlands (NED)	0	0	1	1
13	Norway (NOR)	0	0	1	1
Totals (15 entries)		12	12	18	42
