= 2005 European Fencing Championships =

International fencing competition

The 2005 European Seniors Fencing Championships were held in Zalaegerszeg, Hungary from 27 June to 3 July 2005.

== Overview ==
2005 European Seniors Fencing Championship
Category			Gold	Silver	Bronze
Foil	Men's	Individual	Andrea Cassarà (ITA)	Sergey Tikhonov (RUS)	Andrea Baldini (ITA); Jérôme Jault (FRA)
Foil	Men's	Team	Italy	Russia	France
Foil	Women's	Individual	Sylwia Gruchała (POL)	Svetlana Boyko (RUS)	Viktoria Nikichina (RUS); Valentina Cipriani (ITA)
Foil	Women's	Team	Italy	Russia	Romania
Épée	Men's	Individual	Tomasz Motyka (POL)	Pavel Kolobkov (RUS)	Denis Mathieu (FRA); Dmytro Chumak (UKR)
Épée	Men's	Team	Poland	Ukraine	Hungary
Épée	Women's	Individual	Yana Shemyakina (UKR)	Hajnalka Tóth (HUN)	Iuliana Măceșeanu (ROU); Magdalena Grabowska (POL)
Épée	Women's	Team	Russia	Poland	Ukraine
Sabre	Men's	Individual	Aldo Montano (ITA)	Zsolt Nemcsik (HUN)	Steven Bauer (GER); Nicolas Lopez (FRA)
Sabre	Men's	Team	Russia	Poland	Romania
Sabre	Women's	Individual	Yekaterina Fedorkina (RUS)	Sofia Velikaya (RUS)	Ilaria Bianco (ITA); Gioia Marzocca (ITA)
Sabre	Women's	Team	France	Russia	Ukraine

== Medal table ==
Rank	Nation	Gold	Silver	Bronze	Total
1	Russia (RUS)	3	7	1	11
2	Poland (POL)	3	2	1	6
3	Ukraine (UKR)	1	1	3	5
Totals (3 entries)		7	10	5	22

== Results ==
=== Men ===
==== Foil individual ====
Position	Name	Country
1st place, gold medalist(s)	Andrea Cassarà	Italy
2nd place, silver medalist(s)	Sergey Tikhonov	Russia
3rd place, bronze medalist(s)	Andrea Baldini	Italy
3rd place, bronze medalist(s)	Jérôme Jault	France
5.	Marcel Marcilloux	France
6.	Andrei Deev	Russia
7.	Marcin Zawada	Poland
8.	Marco Ramacci	Italy

==== Épée individual ====
Position	Name	Country
1st place, gold medalist(s)	Tomasz Motyka	Poland
2nd place, silver medalist(s)	Pavel Kolobkov	Russia
3rd place, bronze medalist(s)	Mathieu Denis	France
3rd place, bronze medalist(s)	Dmytro Chumak	Ukraine
5.	Marcel Fischer	Switzerland
6.	Marcus Robatsch	Austria
7.	Alexandru Nyisztor	Romania
8.	Vitaly Osharov	Ukraine

==== Sabre individual ====
Position	Name	Country
1st place, gold medalist(s)	Aldo Montano	Italy
2nd place, silver medalist(s)	Zsolt Nemcsik	Hungary
3rd place, bronze medalist(s)	Steven Bauer	Germany
3rd place, bronze medalist(s)	Nicolas Lopez	France
5.	Volodymyr Lukashenko	Ukraine
6.	Dmitry Lapkes	Belarus
7.	Dmitry Aibushev	Russia
8.	Miklós Kósa	Hungary

==== Foil team ====
Position	Country
1st place, gold medalist(s)	Italy
2nd place, silver medalist(s)	Russia
3rd place, bronze medalist(s)	France
4.	Poland
5.	Austria
6.	Great Britain
7.	Israel
8.	Belgium

==== Épée team ====
Position	Country
1st place, gold medalist(s)	Poland
2nd place, silver medalist(s)	Ukraine
3rd place, bronze medalist(s)	Hungary
4.	Belarus
5.	France
6.	Netherlands
7.	Italy
8.	Norway

==== Sabre team ====
Position	Country
1st place, gold medalist(s)	Russia
2nd place, silver medalist(s)	Poland
3rd place, bronze medalist(s)	Romania
4.	Hungary
5.	Ukraine
6.	Belarus
7.	France
8.	Italy

=== Women ===
==== Foil individual ====
Position	Name	Country
1st place, gold medalist(s)	Sylwia Gruchała	Poland
2nd place, silver medalist(s)	Svetlana Boyko	Russia
3rd place, bronze medalist(s)	Valentina Cipriani	Italy
3rd place, bronze medalist(s)	Viktoria Nikishina	Russia
5.	Aida Mohamed	Hungary
6.	Katja Wächter	Germany
7.	Ianna Rouzavina	Russia
8.	Edina Knapek	Hungary

==== Épée individual ====
Position	Name	Country
1st place, gold medalist(s)	Yana Shemyakina	Ukraine
2nd place, silver medalist(s)	Hajnalka Toth	Hungary
3rd place, bronze medalist(s)	Iuliana Măceșeanu	Romania
3rd place, bronze medalist(s)	Magdalena Grabowska	Poland
5.	Nadiya Kazimirchuk	Ukraine
6.	Lyubov Shutova	Russia
7.	Britta Heidemann	Germany
8.	Julianna Révész	Hungary

==== Sabre individual ====
Position	Name	Country
1st place, gold medalist(s)	Yekaterina Fedorkina	Russia
2nd place, silver medalist(s)	Sofiya Velikaya	Russia
3rd place, bronze medalist(s)	Gioia Marzocca	Italy
3rd place, bronze medalist(s)	Ilaria Bianco	Italy
5.	Andreea Pelei	Romania
6.	Anne-Lise Touya	France
7.	Orsolya Nagy	Hungary
8.	Olha Kharlan	Ukraine

==== Foil team ====
Position	Country
1st place, gold medalist(s)	Italy
2nd place, silver medalist(s)	Russia
3rd place, bronze medalist(s)	Romania
4.	Poland
5.	Germany
6.	Ukraine
7.	France
8.	Hungary

==== Épée team ====
Position	Country
1st place, gold medalist(s)	Russia
2nd place, silver medalist(s)	Poland
3rd place, bronze medalist(s)	Ukraine
4.	Hungary
5.	Romania
6.	Estonia
7.	Germany
8.	Switzerland

==== Sabre team ====
Position	Country
1st place, gold medalist(s)	France
2nd place, silver medalist(s)	Russia
3rd place, bronze medalist(s)	Ukraine
4.	Romania
5.	Hungary
6.	Poland
7.	Italy
8.	Great Britain
