= Nadiya Kazimirchuk =

Ukrainian fencer (born 1978)

Personal information
- Born: Nadiya Mykolayivna Kazimirchuk; 27 September 1978 (age 47) Kyiv, Ukrainian SSR, Soviet Union
- Height: 1.75 m (5 ft 9 in)
- Weight: 60 kg (130 lb)

Fencing career
- Sport: Fencing
- Weapon: épée
- Hand: Right-handed
- Club: Dynamo Kiev
- Retired: 2008
- FIE ranking: current ranking
Medal record
Women's épée
European Championships
Bronze medal – third place	2002 Moscow	Team
Bronze medal – third place	2005 Zalaegerszeg	Team
Bronze medal – third place	2006 İzmir	Individual
Summer Universiade
Gold medal – first place	2005 Izmir	Team

Nadiya Kazimirchuk-Fortunatova (Ukrainian: Надія Миколаївна Казімірчук-Фортунатова; born 27 September 1978) is a Ukrainian épée fencer, bronze medallist at the 2006 European Fencing Championships. She competed at the 2004 Summer Olympics, but lost in the first round to China's Zhang Li.
