= Yana Ruzavina =

Russian fencer

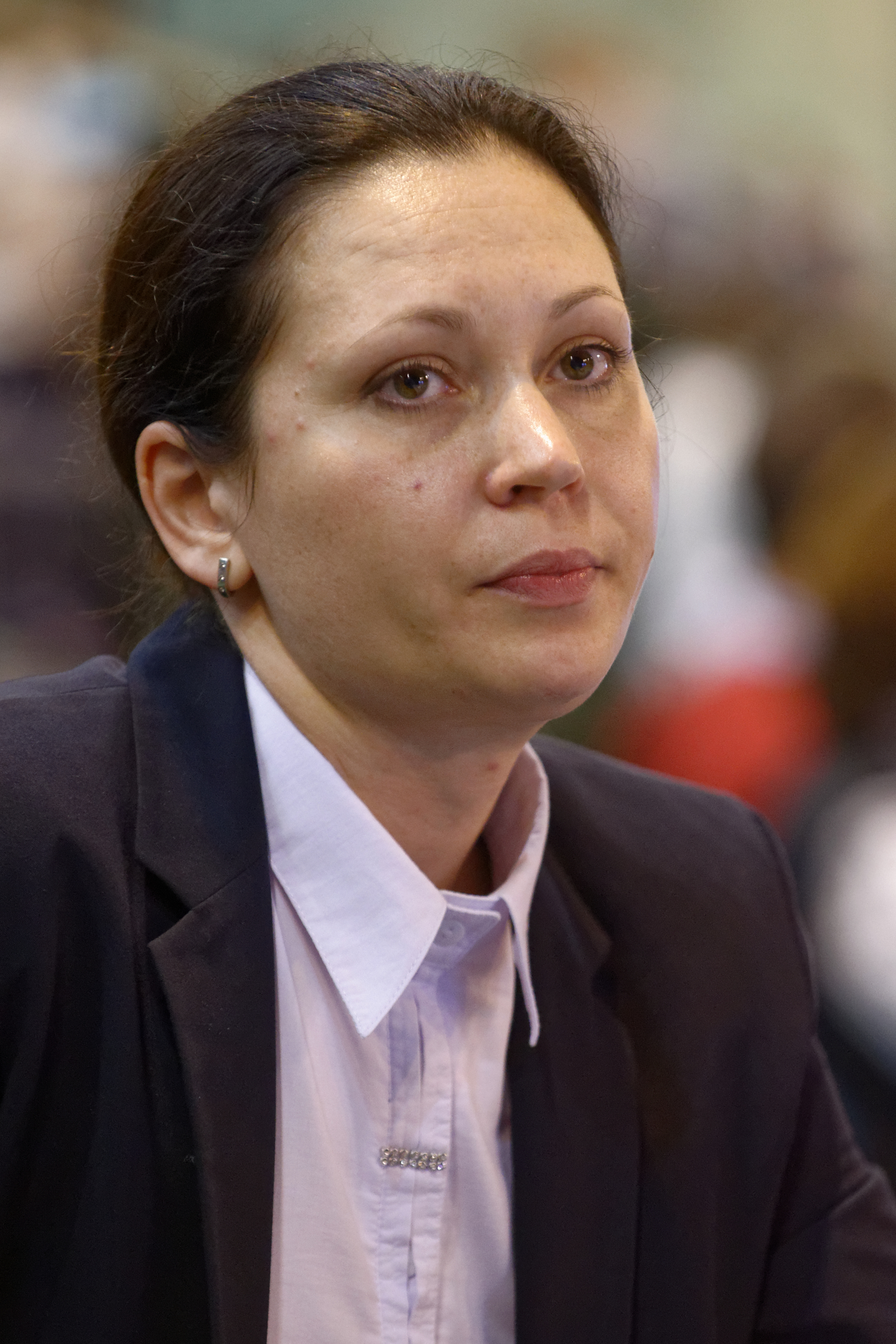
- Yana Ruzavina in 2015

Personal information
- Born: 23 September 1982 (age 43) Kurchatov, Russia

Fencing career
- Sport: Fencing
- Country: Russia
- Weapon: foil
- Hand: left-handed
- FIE ranking: current ranking
Medal record
World Championships
Gold medal – first place	2006 Torino	Foil team
Silver medal – second place	2007 St Petersburg	Foil team
European Championships
Gold medal – first place	2006 İzmir	Foil
Gold medal – first place	2006 İzmir	Team foil
Silver medal – second place	2007 Ghent	Team foil
Silver medal – second place	2005 Zalaegerszeg	Team foil

Ianna Rouzavina (Russian: Яна Рузавина; born 23 September 1982) is a Russian foil fencer.

Rouzavina won the gold medal in the foil team event at the 2006 World Fencing Championships after beating Italy in the final. She accomplished this with her teammates Aida Shanayeva, Julia Khakimova and Svetlana Boyko. She also won the gold medal in the individual foil event at the 2006 European Seniors Fencing Championship.
