= Tomasz Motyka =

Polish fencer (born 1981)

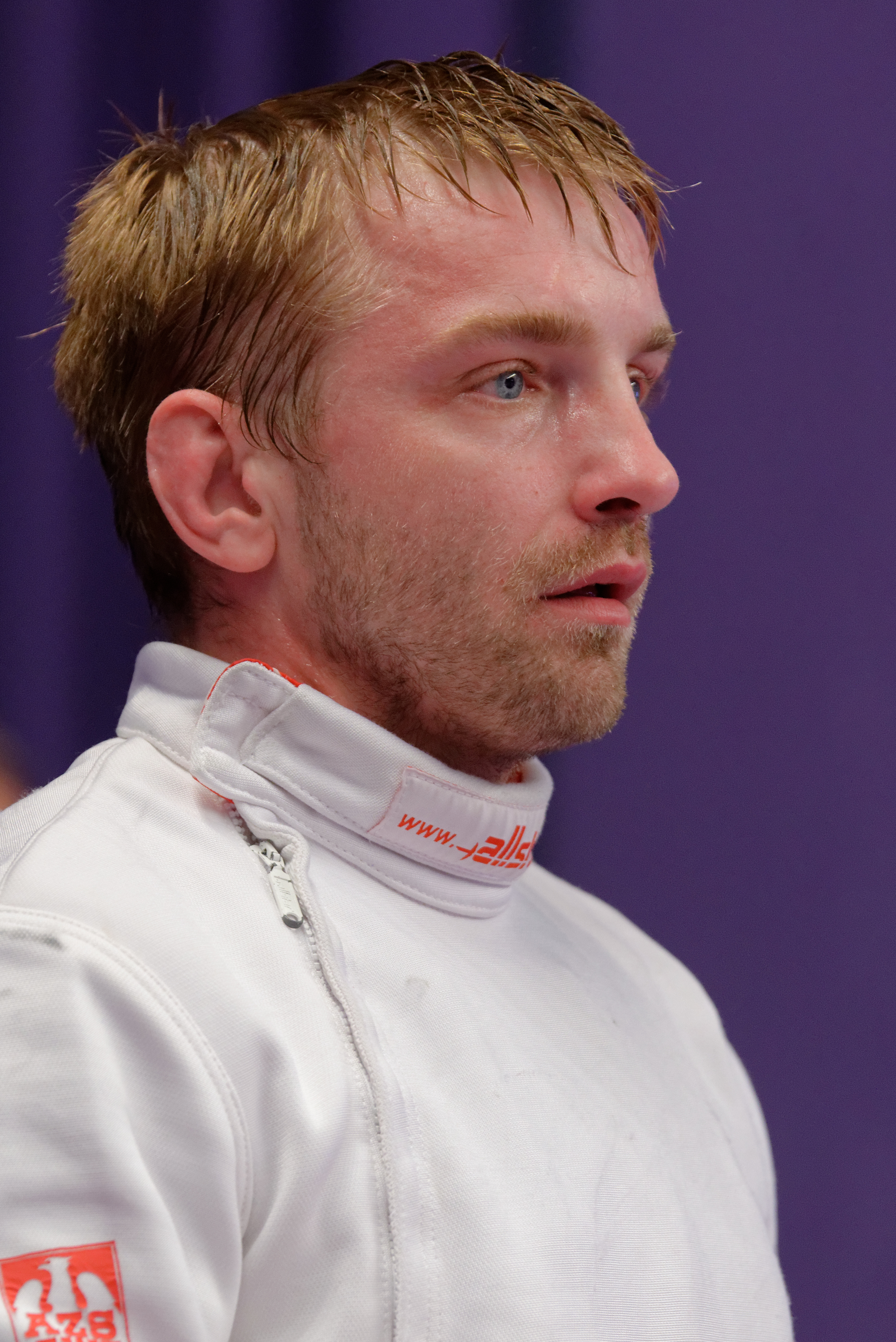

Personal information
- Full name: Tomasz Marek Motyka
- Born: 8 May 1981 (age 45) Wrocław, Poland
- Height: 1.76 m (5 ft 9 in)
- Weight: 75 kg (165 lb)

Fencing career
- Sport: Fencing
- Weapon: épée
- Hand: left-handed
- Club: AZS AWF Wrocław
- FIE ranking: current ranking
Medal record
Men's épée
Representing Poland
Event	1st	2nd	3rd
Olympic Games	0	1	0
World Championships	0	0	1
European Championships	1	4	2
Total	2	5	2
Olympic Games
Silver medal – second place	2008 Beijing	Team Épée
World Championships
Bronze medal – third place	2009 Antalya	Team épée
European Championships
Gold medal – first place	2005 Zalaegerszeg	Épée
Gold medal – first place	2005 Zalaegerszeg	Team épée
Silver medal – second place	2002 Moskva	Team épée
Silver medal – second place	2004 Copenhagen	Team épée
Silver medal – second place	2006 İzmir	Team épée
Silver medal – second place	2007 Gent	Team épée
Bronze medal – third place	2003 Bourges	Épée
Bronze medal – third place	2011 Sheffield	Épée

Tomasz Marek Motyka (born 8 May 1981 in Wrocław) is a Polish épée fencer.

European champion in 2005, he won a silver medal in Men's Team Épée at the 2008 Summer Olympics in Beijing, together with Adam Wiercioch, Radosław Zawrotniak, and Robert Andrzejuk. For his sport achievements, he received the Golden Cross of Merit in 2008.
