= Yekaterina Fedorkina =

Russian fencer

Personal information
- Full name: Yekaterina Igoryevna Fedorkina
- Born: 29 January 1983 (age 43) Kaluga, Russia
- Height: 1.74 m (5 ft 9 in)
- Weight: 68 kg (150 lb)

Fencing career
- Sport: Fencing
- Country: Russia
- Weapon: Sabre
- Hand: Left-handed
- National coach: Dmitry Ronzhin
- Club: Kaluga SDYUSHOR / Olympic Training Centre
- Head coach: Galina Gashinskaya
- Retired: 2010
- FIE ranking: ranking (archive)
Medal record
Women' sabre
Representing Russia
World Championships
Gold medal – first place	2004 New York	Team sabre
Silver medal – second place	2005 Leipzig	Team sabre
Bronze medal – third place	2006 Turin	Team sabre
Bronze medal – third place	2007 St Petersburg	Team sabre
European Championships
Gold medal – first place	2003 Bourges	Team sabre
Gold medal – first place	2004 Copenhagen	Team sabre
Gold medal – first place	2005 Zalaegerszeg	Individual sabre
Gold medal – first place	2006 İzmir	Team sabre
Gold medal – first place	2007 Ghent	Individual sabre
Silver medal – second place	2004 Copenhagen	Individual sabre
Silver medal – second place	2005 Zalaegerszeg	Team sabre
Bronze medal – third place	2007 Ghent	Team sabre
Bronze medal – third place	2008 Kyiv	Individual sabre

Yekaterina Igoryevna Fedorkina (Russian: Екатерина Игоревна Федоркина; also spelled Ekaterina, born 29 March 1983) is a retired Russian sabre fencer, team world champion in 2004 and five-time European champion (team and individual).

== Career ==
Fedorkina first took up rowing when she was ten years old after a rowing coach did a presentation of the sport at her school, but she found it boring. A school friend who was fencing suggested her own sport instead. Coach Galina Gashinskaya took an immediate interest in her after noticing she was left-handed. Despite early evidence of talent Fedorkina stopped training in sixth grade because of the harsh discipline, but Gashinskaya, who lived across the street, joined with her mother to badger her into coming back. After beginning with the foil Fedorkina moved to sabre under the training of Gashinskaya's husband Oleg.

Her first medal in a major event was a bronze medal at the 1999 Cadet World Championships in Dijon, followed by another bronze medal at the 2001 Junior European Championships in Keszthely and at the 2003 Junior World Championships in Trapani. She began fencing in the senior category in the 2002–03 season and climbed the podium in her first World Cup competition with a bronze at the Moscow Grand Prix. That same year she was included in the Russian national team and with Yelena Nechayeva, Sofiya Velikaya and Nataliya Makeyeva she won in Bourges her first European medal, a team gold.

In the 2003–04 season Fedorkina won a silver medal at the European Championships in Copenhagen after ceding in the final to Poland's Aleksandra Socha. At the World Championships held for events absent from the 2004 Summer Olympics programme, Russia won the title in women's team sabre after prevailing over the United States. The next year Fedorkina won the gold medal at the European Championships in Zalaegerszeg. She took part in the team event at the 2008 Summer Olympics. Velikaya, Nechayeva, Yekaterina Dyachenko and Fedorkina lost in the quarter-finals to eventual Olympic champions Ukraine, and finished 5th after the classification rounds.
