= Vitaliy Osharov =

Ukrainian fencer (born 1980)

Personal information
- Born: 16 February 1980 (age 46) Bila Tserkva, Ukrainian SSR, Soviet Union

Sport
- Sport: Fencing
Medal record
Men's épée fencing
Representing Ukraine
World Championships
Bronze medal – third place	2005 Leipzig	Team épée
European Championships
Silver medal – second place	2003 Bourges	Team épée
Silver medal – second place	2005 Zalaegerszeg	Team épée
Summer Universiade
Gold medal – first place	2003 Daegu	Team épée
Gold medal – first place	2005 Izmir	Team épée

Vitaliy Osharov (Ukrainian: Віталій Ошаров; born 16 February 1980) is a Ukrainian fencer. He competed in the team épée event at the 2004 Summer Olympics.
