= Francesca Boscarelli =

Italian fencer (born 1982)

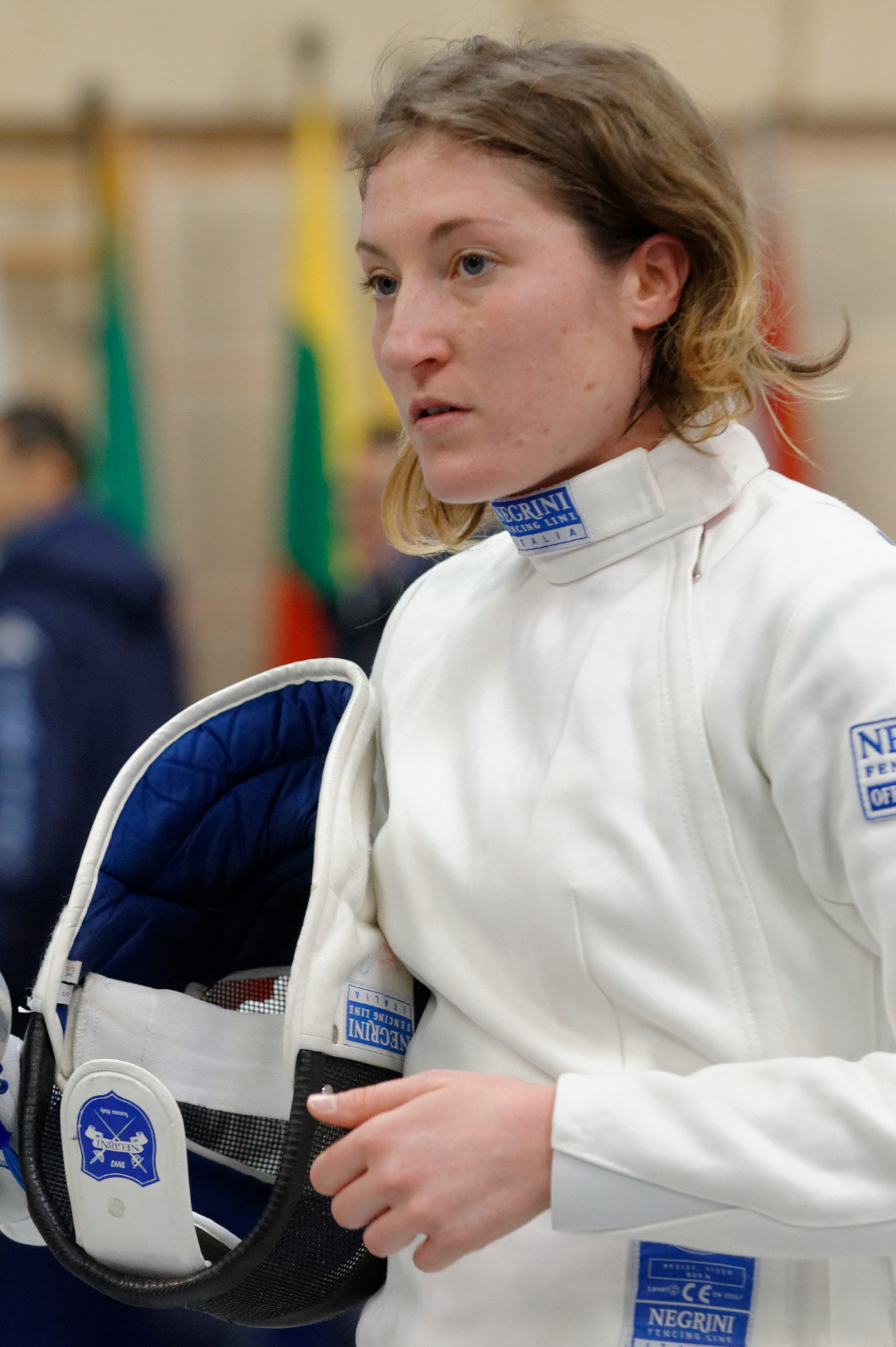

Personal information
- Born: 27 May 1982 (age 44) Benevento, Italy

Fencing career
- Sport: Fencing
- Country: Italy
- Weapon: épée
- Hand: right-handed
- National coach: Sandro Cuomo
- Club: CS Esercito
- Personal coach: Mario Renzulli
- FIE ranking: current ranking
Medal record
European Championships
Gold medal – first place	2007 Ghent	Team
Bronze medal – third place	2008 Kiev	Team
Bronze medal – third place	2015 Montreux	Team

Francesca Boscarelli (born 27 May 1982) is an Italian épée fencer, team gold medallist at the 2007 European Championships and team bronze medallist at the 2009 Summer Universiade.

== Career ==
Boscarelli started fencing at the age of twelve at CS Sannita in her native town of Benevento under the guidance of Carmine Bozzella. After earning her first regional and national successes, she transferred to Naples where she trained with Sandro Cuomo. In 2007, she joined CS Esercito, the sport section of the Italian Army. She won her first senior national championship and earned a team gold medal at the 2007 European Championships in Ghent, followed by a team bronze medal at the 2008 edition in Kiev. She was also a member of the Italian team that took a bronze medal in 2009 Summer Universiade in Belgrade.

Boscarelli climbed her first World Cup podium with a bronze medal at the 2010 Montreal Grand Prix. In the 2014–15 season she won the Rio de Janeiro Grand Prix.
