= Nicolas Beaudan =

French foil fencer

Medal record

Representing France

Men's Fencing

World Championships
Gold medal – first place	2005 Leipzig	Team Foil
Gold medal – first place	2006 Turin	Team foil
Gold medal – first place	2007 St. Petersburg	Team foil
Bronze medal – third place	2005 Leipzig	Foil

Nicolas Beaudan (born 13 December 1975 in Clermont-Ferrand) is a French foil fencer. His nickname is the "black cat". He began fencing when he was eight years old. He is licensed at the Masque de Fer de Lyon.

After spending eight years at the French National Institute of Sport and Physical Education (INSEP), he left in 2004, wanting better results, despite a team gold medal at the European Fencing Championships in 2002.

In 2005, he joined the French team and was selected for the 2005 World Fencing Championships which took place in Leipzig. He won an individual bronze medal and a team gold medal with his teammates Erwann Le Péchoux, Victor Sintès, and Brice Guyart, an Olympic gold medalist.

In 2006, he won another team gold medal at the 2006 World Fencing Championships in Turin with Erwann Le Péchoux, Marcel Marcilloux, and Loïc Attely.

In 2007, he won a third consecutive team gold medal at the 2007 World Fencing Championships in Saint Petersburg with Le Péchoux, Marcel Marcilloux, and Brice Guyart.
