= Fencing at the 2005 Summer Universiade =

The fencing competition in the 2005 Summer Universiade was held in İzmir, Turkey.

== Medal overview ==
=== Men's events ===
Event	Gold	Silver	Bronze
Individual épée	Christoph Marik (AUT)	Dong Guotao (CHN)	Dmytro Chumak (UKR); Marcel Fischer (SUI)
Individual foil	Andrea Baldini (ITA)	Radoslaw Glonek (POL)	Andrea Cassarà (ITA); Youri Moltchan (RUS)
Individual sabre	Aleksey Yakimenko (RUS)	Aleksey Frosin (RUS)	Fernando Cácares (ESP); Vladyslav Tretiak (UKR)
Team épée	Ukraine (UKR)	France (FRA)	Russia (RUS)
Team foil	Japan (JPN)	Italy (ITA)	Russia (RUS)
Team sabre	Russia (RUS)	Ukraine (UKR)	Italy (ITA)

=== Women's events ===
Event	Gold	Silver	Bronze
Individual épée	Olga Aleksejeva (EST)	Li Na (CHN)	Hanna Cygan (POL); Irina Embrich (EST)
Individual foil	Lee Hye-Sun (KOR)	Margherita Granbassi (ITA)	Kanae Ikehata (JPN); Julia Khakimova (RUS)
Individual sabre	Sofiya Velikaya (RUS)	Kim Keum-Hwa (KOR)	Yelena Nechayeva (RUS); Sun Henan (CHN)
Team épée	Ukraine (UKR)	Russia (RUS)	China (CHN)
Team foil	Italy (ITA)	South Korea (KOR)	Russia (RUS)
Team sabre	Russia (RUS)	Japan (JPN)	Poland (POL)

== Medal table ==
Rank	Nation	Gold	Silver	Bronze	Total
1	Russia (RUS)	4	2	6	12
2	Italy (ITA)	2	2	2	6
3	Ukraine (UKR)	2	1	2	5
4	South Korea (KOR)	1	2	0	3
5	Japan (JPN)	1	1	1	3
6	Estonia (EST)	1	0	1	2
7	Austria (AUT)	1	0	0	1
8	China (CHN)	0	2	2	4
9	Poland (POL)	0	1	2	3
10	France (FRA)	0	1	0	1
11	Spain (ESP)	0	0	1	1
11	Switzerland (SUI)	0	0	1	1
Totals (12 entries)		12	12	18	42
