= Andrea Baldini =

Italian fencer (born 1985)

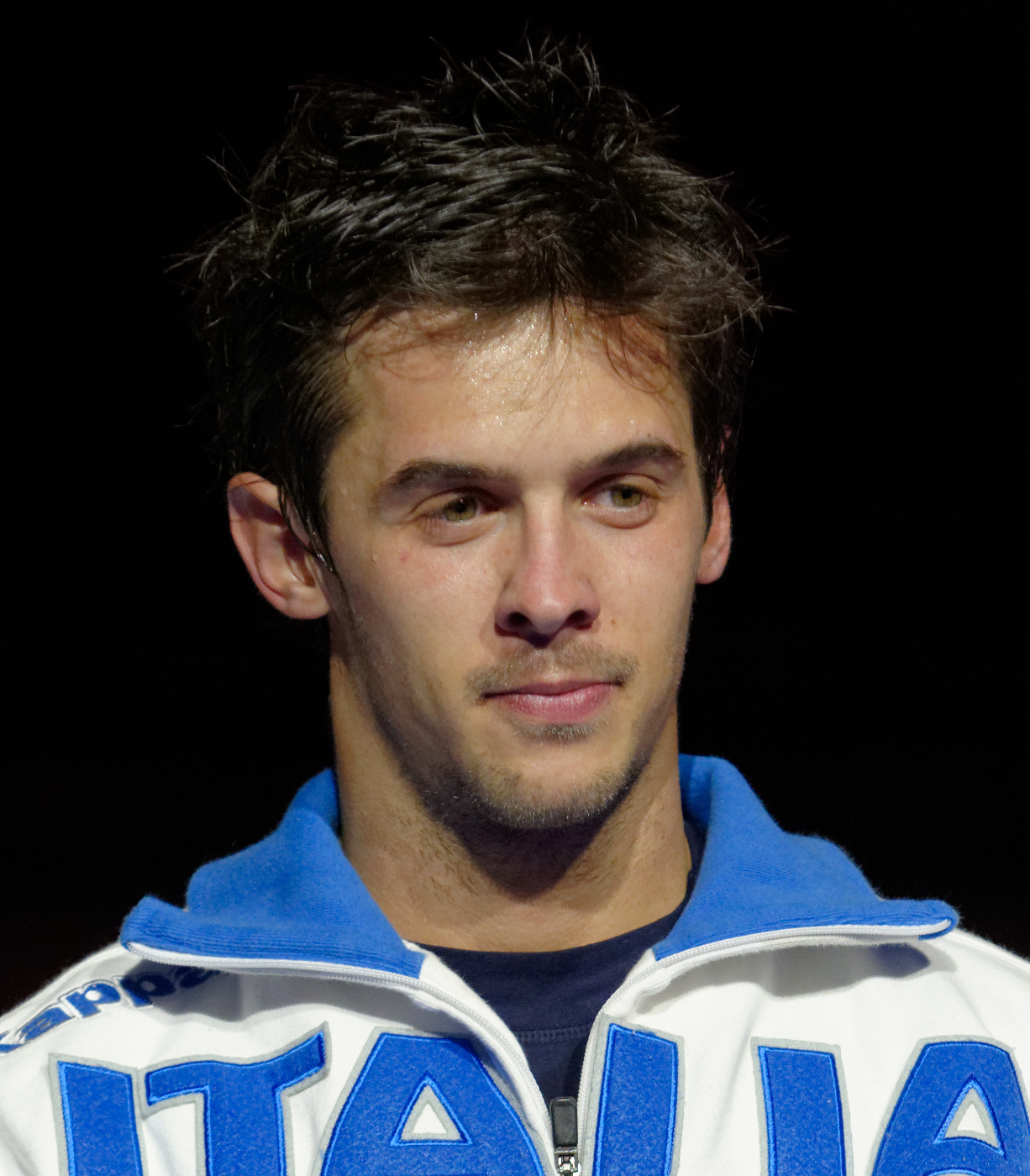
- Baldini in 2013

Personal information
- Born: 19 December 1985 (age 40) Livorno, Tuscany, Italy
- Height: 1.75 m (5 ft 9 in)
- Weight: 68 kg (150 lb)

Fencing career
- Sport: Fencing
- Country: Italy
- Weapon: Foil
- Hand: Left-handed
- National coach: Stefano Cerioni
- Club: Fides Livorno Club
- FIE ranking: current ranking
Medal record
Olympic Games
Gold medal – first place	2012 London	Team foil
World Championships
Gold medal – first place	2009 Antalya	Individual foil
Gold medal – first place	2009 Antalya	Team foil
Gold medal – first place	2013 Budapest	Team foil
Gold medal – first place	2015 Moscow	Team foil
Silver medal – second place	2005 Leipzig	Team foil
Silver medal – second place	2006 Turin	Individual foil
Silver medal – second place	2007 St. Petersburg	Individual foil
Silver medal – second place	2010 Paris	Team foil
Bronze medal – third place	2006 Turin	Team foil
Bronze medal – third place	2014 Kazan	Team foil
European Championships
Gold medal – first place	2005 Zalaegerszeg	Team foil
Gold medal – first place	2007 Gand	Individual foil
Gold medal – first place	2009 Plovdiv	Individual foil
Gold medal – first place	2009 Plovdiv	Team foil
Gold medal – first place	2010 Leipzig	Individual foil
Gold medal – first place	2011 Sheffield	Team foil
Gold medal – first place	2012 Legnano	Team foil
Silver medal – second place	2014 Strasbourg	Team foil
Bronze medal – third place	2004 Copenhagen	Team foil
Bronze medal – third place	2005 Zalaegerszeg	Individual foil
Bronze medal – third place	2007 Gand	Team foil
Gold medal – first place	2011 Sheffield	Individual foil
Bronze medal – third place	2013 Zagreb	Individual foil

Andrea Baldini (born 19 December 1985) is an Italian foil fencer, several-time European and World champion and team Olympic champion in 2012. He is the only foil fencer in history to have obtained four golds (European and World - individual and team event) and the final victory in the World Cup in the same season.

== Biography ==
=== 2003-07; # 1 world ranking ===
He made his debut in the Senior World Cup in the 2003/2004 season and obtained an extraordinary second place in Vienna at the age of 18. In the following season, he won his first senior World Cup in Espinho, Portugal. In 2005, he got gold (individual) and a bronze (team) at the Universiade held in Izmir, Turkey, followed by a bronze (individual) and gold (team) at the Europeans in Zalaegerszeg. These results, at just 19 years old, cast him definitively into the quartet of the titular national team. Confirmation of that comes at his first Senior World Championship in Leipzig: sixth in the individual event and silver in the team.

In 2006, he was third in the general World Ranking, thanks to the individual silver won at the World Fencing Championships in Turin. He was defeated only in the final by the German Peter Joppich for 15 to 14.

In the 2007 season, he obtained the top of the world ranking thanks to a gold medal in Seoul World Cup, a silver medal in Havana. He repeated the same feat a year later at the 2007 World Championships, this time losing 15–9 to Joppich. In the same year, he won bronzes in Bonn, Espinho and Cairo.

=== 2008-09; suspension and reinstatement ===
On 2 July he won his first individual European title in Ghent and with it qualified for his first Olympics.

Baldini, however, while world # 1, did not take part in the Games, as he was excluded a few days before he departed for Beijing due to a controversial case of positivity to a diuretic. The Italian Olympic Committee reported on 1 August 2008 he had failed a doping test, testing positive for banned diuretic Furosemide (more commonly known as Lasix; it is on the World Anti-Doping Agency's banned drug list due to concerns that it may mask other drugs) at the European Championships in Kyiv, Ukraine, and would therefore miss the Beijing Olympics. Baldini suggested he may have been a victim of foul play, though the Italian Olympic Committee dropped its inquiry into an alleged conspiracy plot in October 2008. In April 2009 the public prosecutor of Livorno, Italy, filed a complaint against unknown persons for a "sufficiently proven" conspiracy, but writing that it was not possible to identify the person who sabotaged Baldini, with three possible hypotheses according to the prosecutor being "athletes of another nationality with an interest in getting rid of one of the most dangerous candidates for the title; Andrea Cassarà [summoned to the Olympics in his place]; or a Cassarà / Coni family political plot". Baldini said "Let's say that it is certainly one of the three." In April 2009 he was given a retroactive six-month ban by the FIE international federation and stripped of his European Championships team foil gold medal, subject to approval by the World Anti-Doping Agency. On 10 April 2009 the International Fencing Federation, also taking into account the conclusions of ordinary justice, recognizes the good faith of the athlete and the alleged sabotage of his water bottle, and allows him to return to the piste after his six-month ban. The ruling meant that both he and his Italian teammates forfeited their gold medals in team foil at the European Championships, and their gold medals were given to the Polish foil fencers; monetary prizes were also redistributed.

Baldini, together with Gazzetta dello Sport journalist Marisa Poli, will write a book about it, entitled "Beijing: The Forbidden City".

Back in the middle of 2009 season, in just six months, Baldini regained his first place in the world ranking, winning two World Cup events, individual and team gold at the European Championships in Plovdiv, and individual and team gold at World Championships in Antalya, Turkey. On the podium, it displays an Italian flag with Bob Dylan's text "The Hurricane" written on it. He became the only foil fencer in history to obtain four gold medals and the final victory in the World Cup in the same season.

=== 2010-present; Olympic gold ===
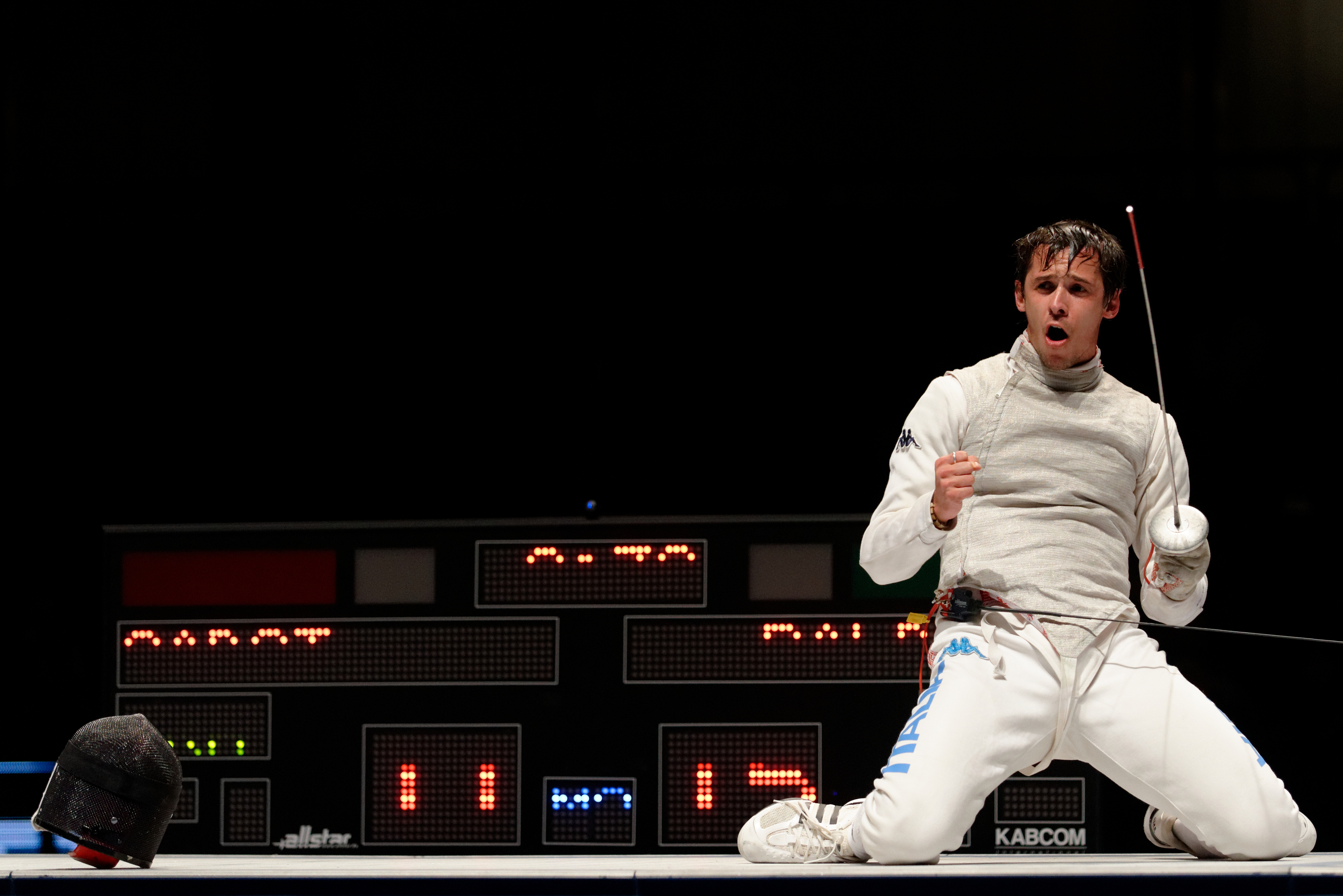
Baldini at the 2013 Final Challenge international de Paris

The following season, 2010, he repeated the success at the European Championships in Leipzig, obtaining again a gold medal at the individual and team events. In the following season, he won the World Cup in Seoul, and repeated the success at the following one held in St. Petersburg. In June 2011 he got the team gold at the European Championships in Sheffield and bronze in the individual event.

On 31 July 2012, Baldini participated in his first Olympics. At the end of the individual competition, however, he remains out of the podium after being defeat in semifinals against the future Olympic champion Lei Sheng and losing then the match for bronze (15–14) in favor of the Korean Choi Byung-chul.

The possibility of redemption comes a few days later. On 5 August 2012, after the world and European titles, Baldini finally obtained the Olympic gold medal. The Italian team led by Coach Stefano Cerioni, and composed by Valerio Aspromonte, Baldini, Andrea Cassarà and Giorgio Avola, defeats Japan in the final, with a score of 45–39, granting Baldini the honor and burden of latest assault, in this case against Yuki Ota.

Season 2013 started with a good series of results for Baldini, who returned to the top of the world ranking thanks to two successes in the World Cup Paris, Bonn and an individual bronze at the European Championships in Zagreb. On 12 August 2013 he won the gold (team) at the World Championships in Budapest, after defeating Russia of former coach Stefano Cerioni in the semifinals: in this match Baldini inherited a difficult situation, with his opponents leading 43–41 at just 49 seconds from the end, but with a partial 4-1 he leads the Italian team to a 45–44 victory.

In 2014, he won silver with his team at the European Championships in Strasbourg and a bronze at the World Championships in Kazan. In 2015, he won the gold medal in men's team foil at the World Championship in Moscow and he qualified for the Rio 2016 Olympic Games where he took part in the team event only.

== Personal life ==
Baldini earned a bachelor's degree in political science in 2015 and a master's degree in international relations at the Fletcher School of Law and Diplomacy at Tufts University in Boston.

Since 23 April 2013, Baldini has been a spokesperson with UNICEF's Vogliamo Zero campaign for the elimination of infant mortality under the age of five.

On 29 July 2020, Baldini married Turkish Olympian fencer Irem Karamete, whom he also coaches.
