= Edina Knapek =

Hungarian fencer (born 1977)

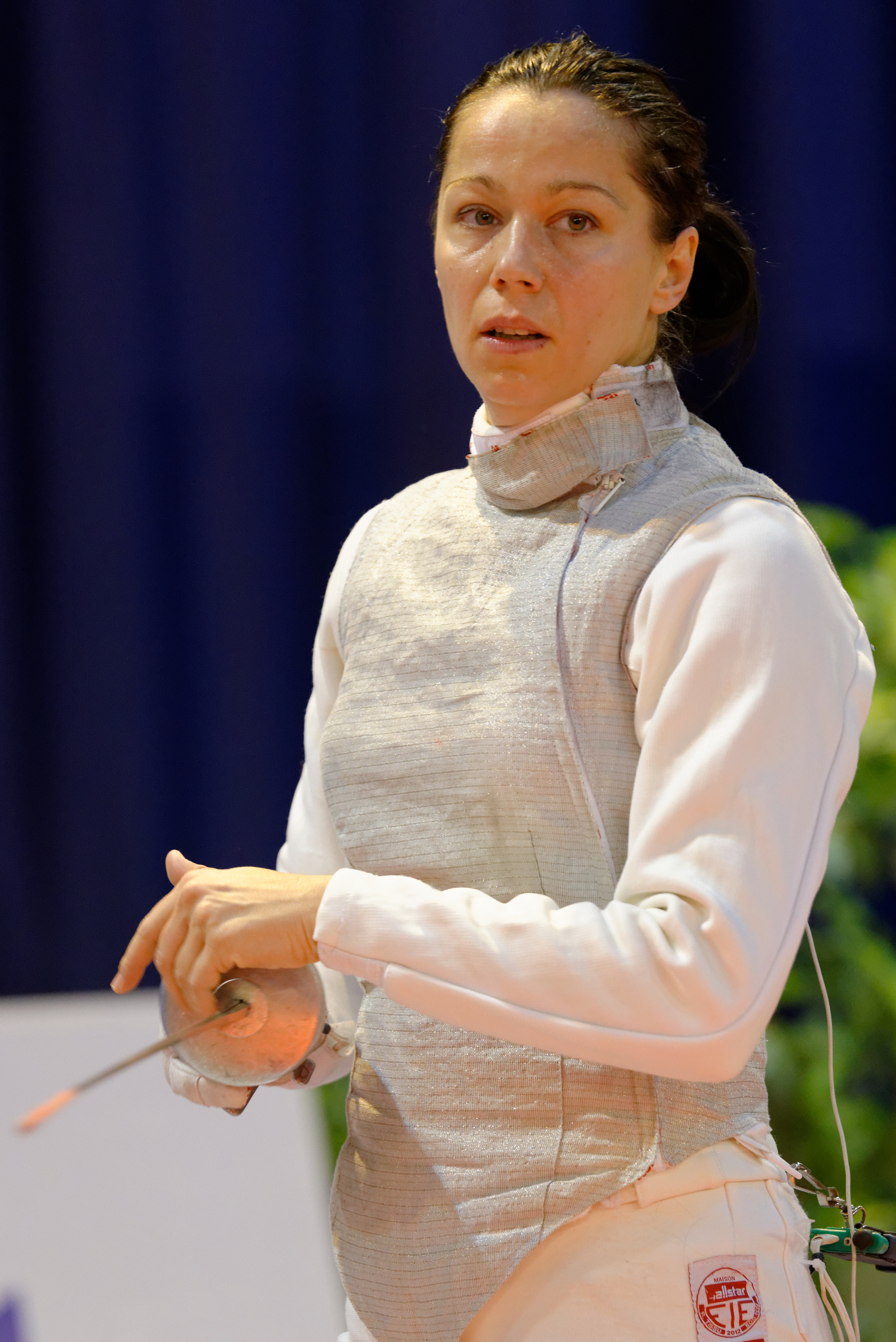

Personal information
- Born: 5 October 1977 (age 48) Budapest, Hungary
- Height: 1.65 m (5 ft 5 in)
- Weight: 52 kg (115 lb)

Fencing career
- Sport: Fencing
- Weapon: foil
- Hand: right-handed
- Club: Bp. Honvéd
- FIE ranking: current ranking
Medal record
Women's foil
Representing Hungary
World Championships
Bronze medal – third place	2002 Lisbon	Individual
Bronze medal – third place	2005 Leipzig	Individual
European Championships
Gold medal – first place	2007 Ghent	Team
Silver medal – second place	2001 Koblenz	Team
Bronze medal – third place	1999 Bolzano	Team
Bronze medal – third place	2001 Koblenz	Individual
Bronze medal – third place	2011 Sheffield	Individual
Bronze medal – third place	2013 Zagreb	Team

Edina Knapek (born 5 October 1977) is a Hungarian foil fencer, bronze medallist at the 2002 and 2005 World Championships, and team gold medallist at the 2007 European Championships. She competed in the women's individual and team foil events at the 2000 and 2008 Summer Olympics.
