= Anton Avdeev =

Russian épée fencer

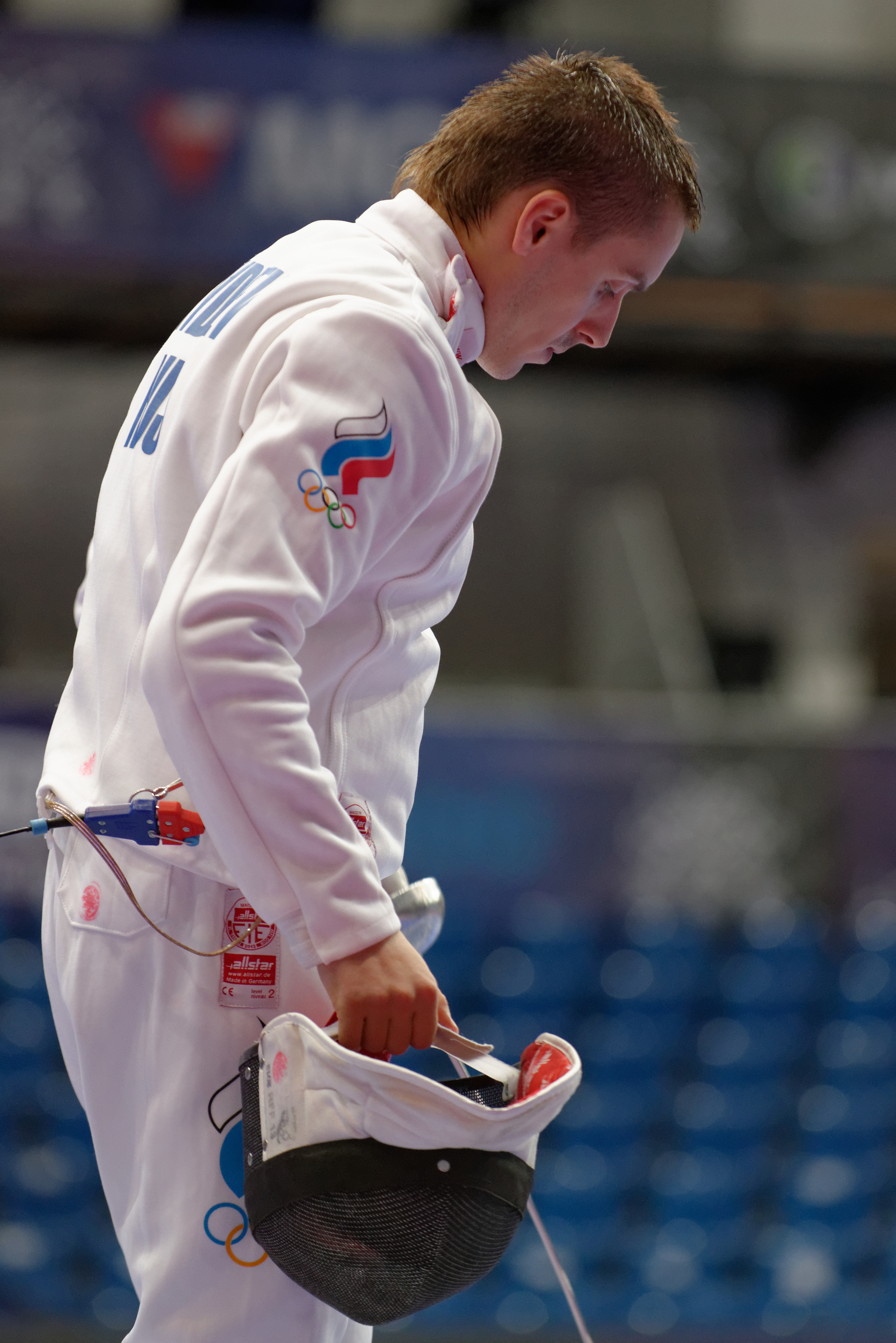
- At the 2013 World Fencing Championships

Personal information
- Full name: Anton Alekseyevich Avdeyev
- Nationality: Russia
- Born: 8 September 1986 (age 40) Voskresensk, Moscow Oblast, Russian SFSR
- Height: 1.74 m (5 ft 9 in)
- Weight: 80 kg (176 lb)

Fencing career
- Sport: Fencing
- Weapon: Épée
- Hand: Left-handed
- Club: Dynamo Moskva Oblast
- FIE ranking: current ranking
Medal record
Men's fencing
Representing Russia
World Championships
Gold medal – first place	2009 Antalya	Individual épée
European Championships
Bronze medal – third place	2007 Ghent	Individual épée
Bronze medal – third place	2014 Strasbourg	Team épée

Anton Alekseyevich Avdeyev (also spelled Avdeev, Russian: Антон Алексеевич Авдеев; born 8 September 1986) is a Russian left-handed former épée fencer and 2009 individual world champion.

== Medal Record ==
=== World Championship ===
Year	Location	Event	Position
2009	Antalya, Turkey	Individual Men's Épée	1st

=== European Championship ===
Year	Location	Event	Position
2007	Ghent, Belgium	Individual Men's Épée	3rd
2014	Strasbourg, France	Team Men's Épée	3rd

=== Grand Prix ===
Year	Location	Event	Position
2013	Doha, Qatar	Individual Men's Épée	2nd
2014	Doha, Qatar	Individual Men's Épée	3rd

=== World Cup ===
Year	Location	Event	Position
2008	Buenos Aires, Argentina	Individual Men's Épée	2nd
2016	Heidenheim, Germany	Individual Men's Épée	3rd
