= Gabriella Varga =

Hungarian fencer (born 1982)

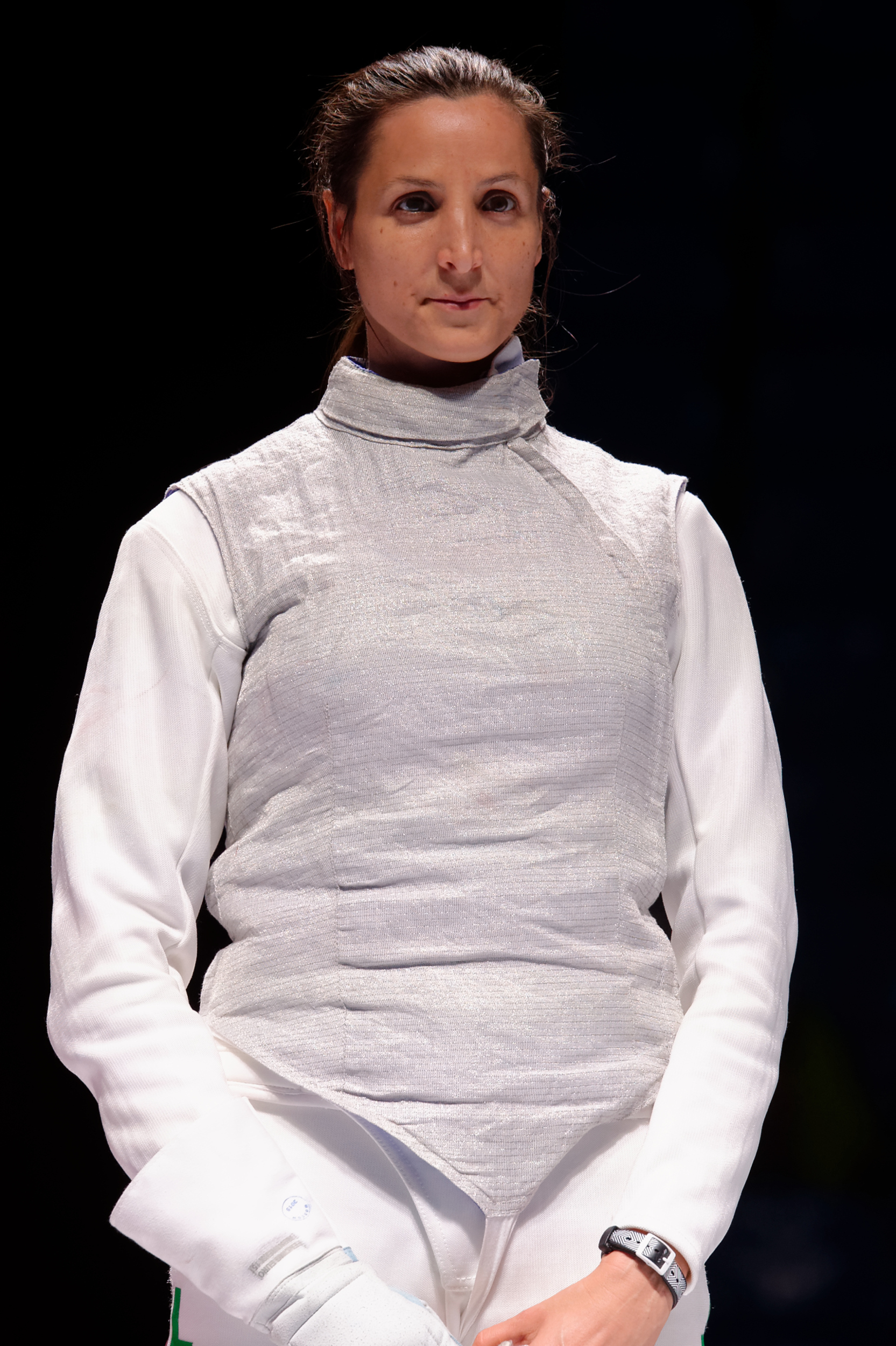
- Gabriella Varga in 2015

Personal information
- Born: 7 April 1982 (age 44) Budapest, Hungary
- Height: 1.80 m (5 ft 11 in)
- Weight: 65 kg (143 lb)

Fencing career
- Sport: Fencing
- Weapon: Foil
- Hand: Right-handed
- FIE ranking: current ranking
Medal record
Women's foil
Representing Hungary
European Championships
Gold medal – first place	2003 Bourges	Individual
Gold medal – first place	2007 Bourges	Team
Bronze medal – third place	2009 Plovdiv	Individual
Bronze medal – third place	2013 Zagreb	Team

Gabriella Varga (born 7 April 1982) is a Hungarian foil fencer. On top of being an individual European champion in 2003 and a team European champion in 2007, Varga competed in the women's foil events at the 2004 and 2008 Summer Olympics.
