= Renal Ganeyev =

Russian fencer (born 1985)

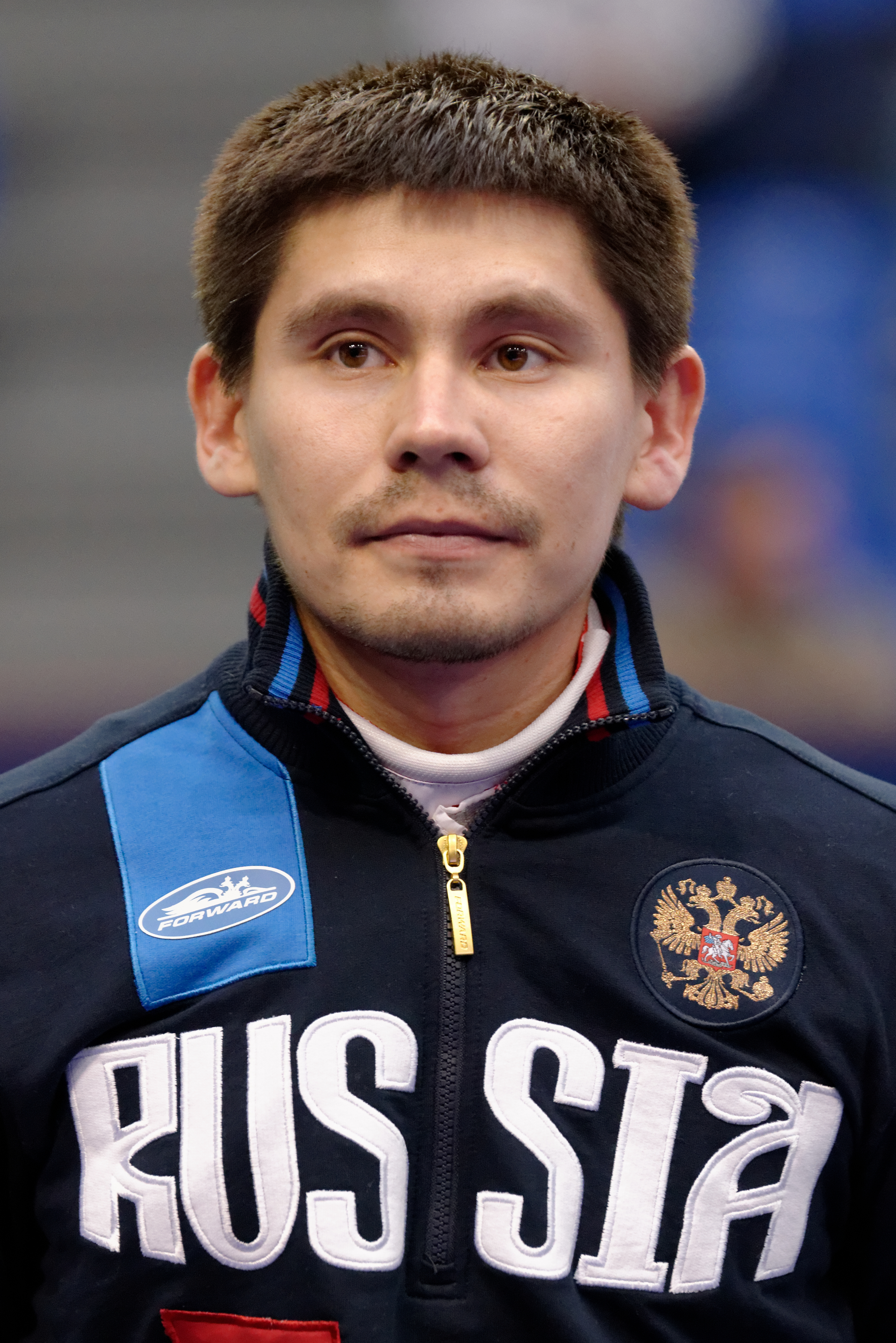

Personal information
- Full name: Renal Ramilevich Ganeyev
- Nationality: Russian
- Born: 13 January 1985 (age 41) Ufa, Republic of Bashkortostan
- Height: 1.78 m (5 ft 10 in)
- Weight: 72 kg (159 lb)

Fencing career
- Sport: Fencing
- Weapon: Foil
- Hand: Left-handed
- National coach: Stefano Cerioni
- Club: CSKA Moscow
- FIE ranking: current ranking
Medal record
Olympic Games
Bronze medal – third place	2004 Athens	Team foil
World Championships
Silver medal – second place	2015 Moscow	Team foil
Bronze medal – third place	2009 Antalya	Team foil
European Championships
Gold medal – first place	2004 Copenhagen	Team foil
Silver medal – second place	2007 Ghent	Team foil
Silver medal – second place	2009 Plovdiv	Team foil
Silver medal – second place	2010 Leipzig	Team foil
Bronze medal – third place	2010 Leipzig	Individual foil
Bronze medal – third place	2011 Sheffield	Team foil
Bronze medal – third place	2014 Strasbourg	Team foil

Renal Ramilevich Ganeyev (Russian: Реналь Рамилевич Ганеев, also spelled Ganeev; born 13 January 1985) is a Russian former fencer, who won bronze Olympic medal in the team foil competition at the 2004 Summer Olympics in Athens.
