= Sofya Velikaya =

Russian fencer (born 1985)

Sofiya Velikaya
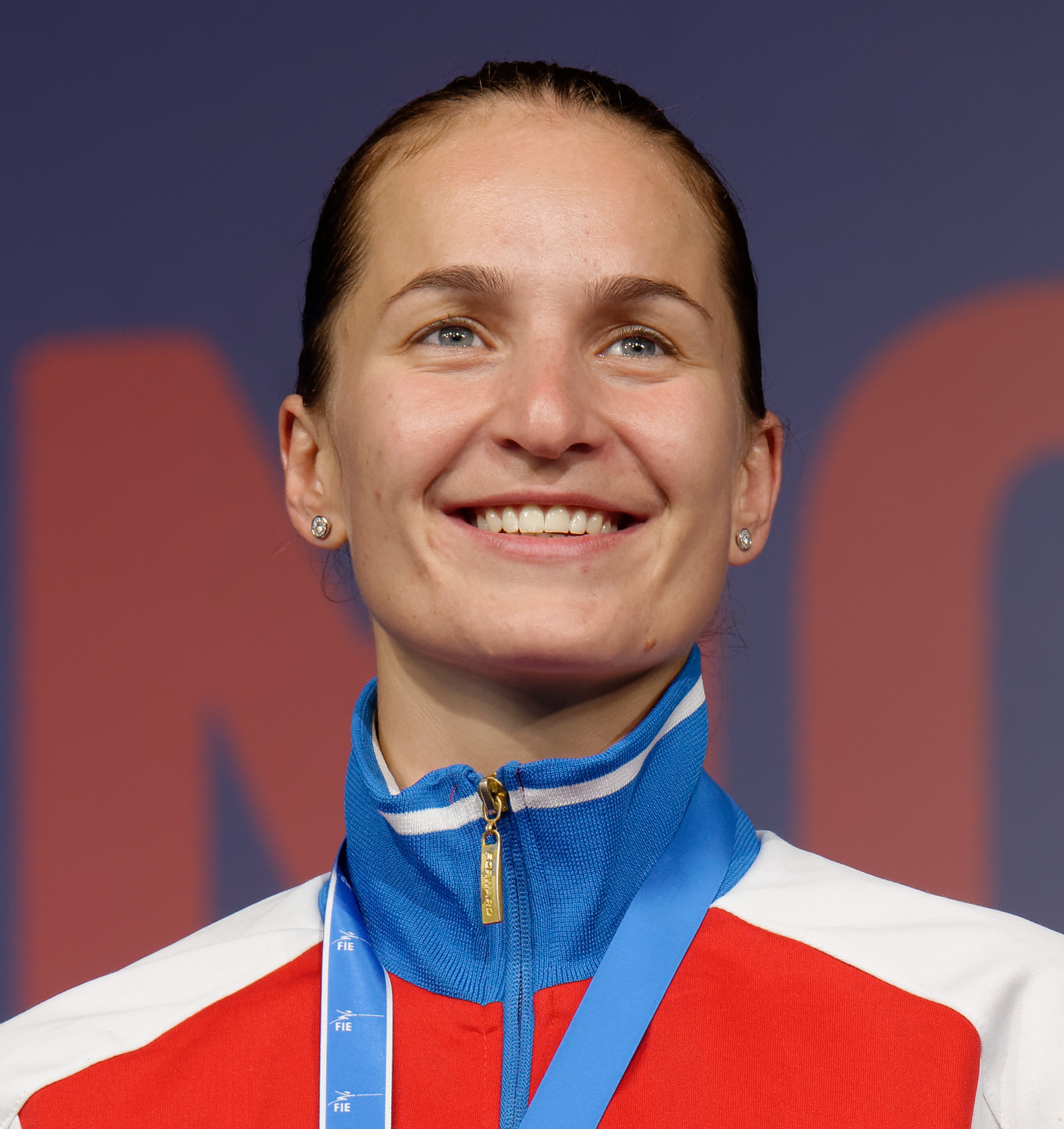
- Velikaya at the 2015 World Championships

Personal information
- Full name: Sofiya Aleksandrovna Velikaya
- Nationality: (Russia) Russian
- Born: 8 June 1985 (age 41) Almaty, Kazakh SSR, Soviet Union
- Height: 1.75 m (5 ft 9 in)
- Weight: 68 kg (150 lb)

Fencing career
- Sport: Fencing
- Country: Russia
- Weapon: Sabre
- Hand: Right-handed
- National coach: Dmitry Glotov
- Club: Russian Central Sports Army Club and MGFSO
- FIE ranking: current ranking
Medal record
Representing (Russia) ROC
Olympic Games
Gold medal – first place	2020 Tokyo	Team sabre
Silver medal – second place	2020 Tokyo	Individual sabre
Representing Russia
Olympic Games
Gold medal – first place	2016 Rio de Janeiro	Team sabre
Silver medal – second place	2016 Rio de Janeiro	Individual sabre
Silver medal – second place	2012 London	Individual sabre
World Championships
Gold medal – first place	2004 New York	Team sabre
Gold medal – first place	2010 Paris	Team sabre
Gold medal – first place	2011 Catania	Individual sabre
Gold medal – first place	2011 Catania	Team sabre
Gold medal – first place	2012 Kyiv	Team sabre
Gold medal – first place	2015 Moscow	Individual sabre
Gold medal – first place	2015 Moscow	Team sabre
Gold medal – first place	2019 Budapest	Team sabre
Silver medal – second place	2005 Leipzig	Individual sabre
Silver medal – second place	2005 Leipzig	Team sabre
Silver medal – second place	2018 Wuxi	Individual sabre
Silver medal – second place	2018 Wuxi	Team sabre
Silver medal – second place	2019 Budapest	Individual sabre
Bronze medal – third place	2006 Turin	Team sabre
Bronze medal – third place	2007 St.Petersburg	Team sabre
Bronze medal – third place	2010 Paris	Individual sabre
European Championships
Gold medal – first place	2003 Bourges	Team sabre
Gold medal – first place	2004 Copenhagen	Team sabre
Gold medal – first place	2006 İzmir	Individual sabre
Gold medal – first place	2006 İzmir	Team sabre
Gold medal – first place	2008 Kyiv	Individual sabre
Gold medal – first place	2012 Legnano	Team sabre
Gold medal – first place	2014 Strasbourg	Team sabre
Gold medal – first place	2015 Montreux	Individual sabre
Gold medal – first place	2015 Montreux	Team sabre
Gold medal – first place	2016 Toruń	Individual sabre
Gold medal – first place	2016 Toruń	Team sabre
Gold medal – first place	2018 Novi Sad	Individual sabre
Gold medal – first place	2018 Novi Sad	Team sabre
Gold medal – first place	2019 Düsseldorf	Team sabre
Silver medal – second place	2005 Zalaegerszeg	Individual sabre
Silver medal – second place	2005 Zalaegerszeg	Team sabre
Silver medal – second place	2007 Ghent	Individual sabre
Silver medal – second place	2009 Plovdiv	Team sabre
Silver medal – second place	2010 Leipzig	Individual sabre
Silver medal – second place	2010 Leipzig	Team sabre
Bronze medal – third place	2007 Ghent	Team sabre
Bronze medal – third place	2011 Sheffield	Team sabre
Bronze medal – third place	2019 Düsseldorf	Individual sabre
Military World Games
Gold medal – first place	2019 Wuhan	Team sabre
Summer Universiade
Gold medal – first place	2005 İzmir	Individual sabre
Gold medal – first place	2005 İzmir	Team sabre
Silver medal – second place	2003 Daegu	Team sabre

Sofiya Aleksandrovna Velikaya (Russian: Софья Александровна Великая, IPA: [ˈsofʲjə vʲɪˈlʲikəjə]; born 8 June 1985) is a Russian sabre fencer.

Velikaya is a former European champion (four-time individual, six-time team), world champion (two-time individual, six-time team), and two-time Olympic team champion. She competed in the 2008, 2012, 2016, and 2020 Olympics, and is a three-time individual silver medalist.

She dedicated her team's 2016 Olympic gold medal to those Russians who had been banned for doping. In January 2024, Velikaya was included in the list of proxies of presidential candidate Vladimir Putin in the 2024 Russian presidential election.

== Career ==
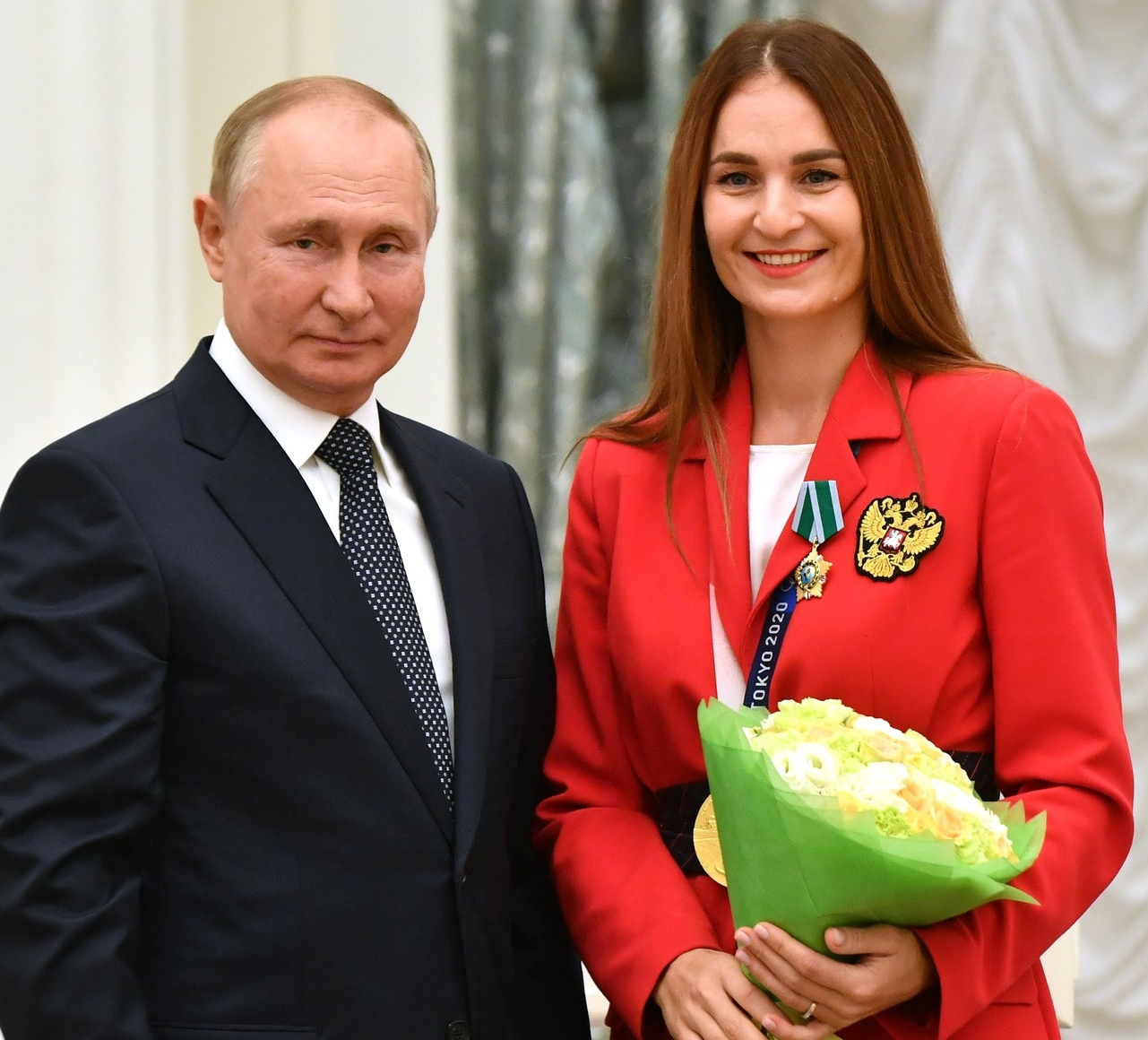
Velikaya receives the Order of Friendship from Vladimir Putin in 2021

Velikaya is a Russian Armed Forces captain. Her fencing clubs are the Russian Central Sports Army Club and MGFSO.

=== 2008–15 ===
She placed fourth in the 2008 Beijing Games, after losing to American Sada Jacobson 11–15 in the semifinals, and then losing to American Rebecca Ward 14–15 in the bronze medal match. On 12 October 2011, she became the world champion after beating two-time Olympic champion American Mariel Zagunis in the final. One year after, she took part in the Summer Olympics in London, where she advanced to finals after defeating Olga Kharlan of Ukraine. Velikaya lost however to South Korea's Kim Ji-yeon, 9–15, and received silver.

Velikaya then took a break in her career. She gave birth to a son, with Olympic wrestler Aleksey Mishin. She came back to international competition in March 2014 at the Antalya World Cup, where she was defeated in the second round by Hungary's Anna Várhelyi. At the European Championships in Strasbourg, she was stopped in the second round again, this time by Italy's Rossella Gregorio. In the team event, Russia met France in the final, and won the gold medal. At the World Championships in Kazan Velikaya made her way to the quarter-finals, where she met reigning World champion Olga Kharlan of Ukraine. Velikaya was defeated 9–15. In the team event, Russia met France in the quarter-finals. Russia suffered a shock 41–45 defeat.

In the 2014–15 season, Velikaya won the first event in Cancún after defeating France's Charlotte Lembach in the final. She placed second with Russia in the team event. In Orléans, she put an end to the invincibility of the world no.1 Olga Kharlan, who had not taken part in the Cancún tournament. Velikaya proceeded to the final where she defeated Italy's Rossella Gregorio and earned her second gold medal in a row. In the team event, Russia saw off the United States in the final to win team gold. Velikaya reached again the final in the New York Grand Prix. She met Kharlan, who defeated her 15–12, dooming her the silver medal. The same scenario played out in Athens at the first World Cup event of 2015, Velikaya losing by a single hit that time. In the team event, Russia fenced Ukraine in the final. Russia lost ground in the penultimate relay, which ended on 33–40. Velikaya lost 2–5 the final relay against Kharlan and came away with a second silver medal. At the Ghent World Cup, she defeated Kharlan 15–3 in the semi-finals, then Zagunis 15–10 in the final, to take her third gold medal of the season.

=== 2016–19 ===
Velikaya qualified for the 2016 Summer Olympics in Rio de Janeiro. In women's sabre in the table of 32 she defeated Bogna Jóźwiak from Poland. In the table of 16, quarter-finals and semi-finals, she prevailed over Charlotte Lembach, Cécilia Berder and Manon Brunet of France, respectively. She eventually lost 14–15 to her teammate Yana Egorian in the finals, winning her second consecutive silver medal at the Olympics in the individual women's sabre. Velikaya finally managed to claim Olympic gold a few days later in the team event. Russia defeated Mexico (45–31) in the quarter-finals, prevailed over the USA (45–42) in the semi-finals and met the Ukrainians in the final. Velikaya and her teammates came away with the gold medal, defeating Ukraine 45–30.

Velikaya dedicated her squad's 2016 Olympic gold medal to those Russians who had been banned for doping.

On 17 November 2016, Velikaya was elected the head of the Russian Olympic Committee Athletes' Commission.

=== 2020–present ===
In April 2022, she said she would boycott the Olympics if she is not allowed to compete under the Russian flag and anthem. Velikaya was not among the Russian athletes reinstated by the FIE in May 2023, due to her ties with the Russian Army.

In January 2024, the Russian state-owned new agency TASS reported that Velikaya was included in the list of proxies of presidential candidate Vladimir Putin in the 2024 Russian presidential election. By law, self-nominated candidates such as Putin are allowed to have proxies who campaign in their favor.

In February 2024, Velikaya commented on three fellow Russian Olympic fencers who had escaped from Russia to the United States, Tokyo Olympics épée silver medalist Sergey Bida, his wife Violetta Bida, and sabre fencer Konstantin Lokhanov. She said: "This is absolutely their right, this is their life. I'm sitting at home."

== Medal record ==
=== Olympic Games ===
Year	Location	Event	Position
2012	London, United Kingdom	Individual Women's Sabre	2nd
2016	Rio de Janeiro, Brazil	Individual Women's Sabre	2nd
2016	Rio de Janeiro, Brazil	Team Women's Sabre	1st
2021	Tokyo, Japan	Individual Women's Sabre	2nd
2021	Tokyo, Japan	Team Women's Sabre	1st

=== World Championship ===
Year	Location	Event	Position
2004	(United States) New York, New York	Team Women's Sabre	1st
2005	Leipzig, Germany	Individual Women's Sabre	2nd
2005	Leipzig, Germany	Team Women's Sabre	2nd
2006	Turin, Italy	Team Women's Sabre	3rd
2007	St. Petersburg, Russia	Team Women's Sabre	3rd
2010	Paris, France	Individual Women's Sabre	3rd
2010	Paris, France	Team Women's Sabre	1st
2011	Catania, Italy	Individual Women's Sabre	1st
2011	Catania, Italy	Team Women's Sabre	1st
2012	Kyiv, Ukraine	Team Women's Sabre	1st
2015	Moscow, Russia	Individual Women's Sabre	1st
2015	Moscow, Russia	Team Women's Sabre	1st
2018	Wuxi, China	Individual Women's Sabre	2nd
2018	Wuxi, China	Team Women's Sabre	2nd
2019	Budapest, Hungary	Individual Women's Sabre	2nd
2019	Budapest, Hungary	Team Women's Sabre	1st

=== European Championship ===
Year	Location	Event	Position
2007	Ghent, Belgium	Individual Women's Sabre	2nd
2007	Ghent, Belgium	Team Women's Sabre	3rd
2008	Kyiv, Ukraine	Individual Women's Sabre	1st
2009	Plovdiv, Bulgaria	Team Women's Sabre	2nd
2010	Leipzig, Germany	Individual Women's Sabre	2nd
2010	Leipzig, Germany	Team Women's Sabre	2nd
2011	Sheffield, United Kingdom	Team Women's Sabre	3rd
2012	Legnano, Italy	Team Women's Sabre	1st
2014	Strasbourg, France	Team Women's Sabre	1st
2015	Montreux, Switzerland	Individual Women's Sabre	1st
2015	Montreux, Switzerland	Team Women's Sabre	1st
2016	Toruń, Poland	Individual Women's Sabre	1st
2016	Toruń, Poland	Team Women's Sabre	1st
2018	Novi Sad, Serbia	Individual Women's Sabre	1st
2018	Novi Sad, Serbia	Team Women's Sabre	1st
2019	Düsseldorf, Germany	Individual Women's Sabre	3rd
2019	Düsseldorf, Germany	Team Women's Sabre	1st

=== Grand Prix ===
Date	Location	Event	Position
2003-03-14	Foggia, Italy	Individual Women's Sabre	3rd
2004-03-20	Moscow, Russia	Individual Women's Sabre	2nd
2004-06-12	(United States) New York, New York	Individual Women's Sabre	2nd
2005-03-18	Moscow, Russia	Individual Women's Sabre	3rd
2006-02-24	Budapest, Hungary	Individual Women's Sabre	1st
2006-03-17	Moscow, Russia	Individual Women's Sabre	2nd
2009-02-06	Orléans, France	Individual Women's Sabre	3rd
2009-02-15	Moscow, Russia	Individual Women's Sabre	2nd
2009-05-29	Tianjin, China	Individual Women's Sabre	1st
2010-02-14	Moscow, Russia	Individual Women's Sabre	3rd
2010-03-19	Tunis, Tunisia	Individual Women's Sabre	3rd
2011-02-11	Orléans, France	Individual Women's Sabre	3rd
2011-03-26	Moscow, Russia	Individual Women's Sabre	1st
2012-02-10	Orléans, France	Individual Women's Sabre	2nd
2012-03-16	Moscow, Russia	Individual Women's Sabre	1st
2013-03-22	Moscow, Russia	Individual Women's Sabre	2nd
2014-12-13	(United States) New York, New York	Individual Women's Sabre	2nd
2015-03-28	Seoul, South Korea	Individual Women's Sabre	3rd
2015-05-29	Moscow, Russia	Individual Women's Sabre	3rd
2015-12-12	(United States) Boston, Massachusetts	Individual Women's Sabre	3rd
2016-03-25	Seoul, South Korea	Individual Women's Sabre	3rd
2018-05-12	Moscow, Russia	Individual Women's Sabre	1st
2019-02-22	Cairo, Egypt	Individual Women's Sabre	1st
2019-05-24	Moscow, Russia	Individual Women's Sabre	1st

=== World Cup ===
Date	Location	Event	Position
2006-05-13	Ghent, Belgium	Individual Women's Sabre	3rd
2008-02-16	Moscow, Russia	Individual Women's Sabre	3rd
2010-06-18	(United States) New York, New York	Individual Women's Sabre	3rd
2011-02-25	London, United Kingdom	Individual Women's Sabre	3rd
2011-06-24	(United States) New York, New York	Individual Women's Sabre	1st
2012-02-24	London, United Kingdom	Individual Women's Sabre	2nd
2012-05-04	Bologna, Italy	Individual Women's Sabre	1st
2014-11-01	Margarita Island, Venezuela	Individual Women's Sabre	1st
2014-11-21	Orléans, France	Individual Women's Sabre	1st
2015-01-30	Athens, Greece	Individual Women's Sabre	2nd
2015-02-20	Ghent, Belgium	Individual Women's Sabre	1st
2015-05-01	Beijing, China	Individual Women's Sabre	1st
2016-01-29	Athens, Greece	Individual Women's Sabre	2nd
2016-02-19	Sint-Niklaas, Belgium	Individual Women's Sabre	3rd
2019-01-25	(United States) Salt Lake City, Utah	Individual Women's Sabre	3rd
2019-05-10	Tunis, Tunisia	Individual Women's Sabre	1st

== Honours and awards ==
- Russian Order of Merit for the Fatherland 1st class (13 August 2012) – for outstanding contribution to the development of physical culture and sports, high achievements at the 30th Olympic Games in London, United Kingdom.
- Russian Athlete of the Year (2015)
- Russian Order of Honour (25 August 2016) – for high achievements at the 31st Olympic Games in Rio de Janeiro, Brazil, the will to win and goal-oriented approach.
- Russian Medal of Military Valour (2016) – 1st class.

== Personal life ==
At the age of 15, Velikaya moved from the city of Almaty in Kazakhstan to Moscow to train in fencing.

Velikaya is married to 2004 Olympic champion wrestler Aleksey Mishin. They have two children together: a son named Oleg, born on 30 November 2013, and a daughter named Zoya, born in 2018.

Olympic Games
Preceded by Sergey Tetyukhin (for Russia)	Flagbearer for ROC (with Maksim Mikhaylov); Tokyo 2020	Succeeded by Incumbent
