= 2007 European Fencing Championships =

International fencing competition

The 2007 European Fencing Championships was held in Ghent, Belgium. The event took place from 2 to 7 June 2007.

== Medal summary ==
=== Men's events ===
Event	Gold	Silver	Bronze
Foil	Andrea Baldini (ITA)	Benjamin Kleibrink (GER)	Salvatore Sanzo (ITA); Erwann Le Péchoux (FRA)
Épée	Jérôme Jeannet (FRA)	Matteo Tagliariol (ITA)	Fabian Kauter (SUI); Anton Avdeev (RUS)
Sabre	Jorge Pina (ESP)	Aleksey Yakimenko (RUS)	Stanislav Pozdnyakov (RUS); Mihai Covaliu (ROU)
Team Foil	Germany	Russia	Italy
Team Épée	Hungary	Poland	France
Team Sabre	Russia	Belarus	France

=== Women's events ===
Event	Gold	Silver	Bronze
Foil	Eugyenia Lamonova (RUS)	Valentina Vezzali (ITA)	Olha Leleiko (UKR); Margherita Granbassi (ITA)
Épée	Laura Flessel (FRA)	Emma Samuelsson (SWE)	Britta Heidemann (GER); Irina Embrich (EST)
Sabre	Ekaterina Fedorkina (RUS)	Sofiya Velikaya (RUS)	Orsolya Nagy (HUN); Olena Khomrova (UKR)
Team Foil	Hungary	Russia	Italy
Team Épée	Italy	Hungary	France
Team Sabre	France	Ukraine	Russia

=== Medal table ===
Rank	Nation	Gold	Silver	Bronze	Total
1	Russia	3	4	3	10
2	France	3	0	4	7
3	Italy	2	2	4	8
4	Hungary	2	1	1	4
5	Germany	1	1	1	3
6	Spain	1	0	0	1
7	Ukraine	0	1	2	3
8	Belarus	0	1	0	1
8	Poland	0	1	0	1
8	Sweden	0	1	0	1
11	Estonia	0	0	1	1
11	Romania	0	0	1	1
11	Switzerland	0	0	1	1
Totals (13 entries)		12	12	18	42

== Results ==
=== Men ===
==== Épée individual ====
Position	Name	Country
1st place, gold medalist(s)	Jérôme Jeannet	France
2nd place, silver medalist(s)	Matteo Tagliariol	Italy
3rd place, bronze medalist(s)	Anton Avdeev	Russia
3rd place, bronze medalist(s)	Fabian Kauter	Switzerland
5.	Gábor Boczkó	Hungary
6.	Carl Frisell	Sweden
7.	Joar Sundman	Sweden
8.	Géza Imre	Hungary

Bracket:

Quarter-finals
(Sweden) Joar Sundman	10
(Italy) Matteo Tagliariol	15
(Switzerland) Fabian Kauter	15
(Sweden) Carl Frisell	8
(Hungary) Gábor Boczkó	13
(Russia) Anton Avdeev	15
(Switzerland) Jérôme Jeannet	15
(Hungary) Géza Imre	10

Semi-finals
(Italy) Matteo Tagliariol	15
(Switzerland) Fabian Kauter	13
(Russia) Anton Avdeev	8
(France) Jérôme Jeannet	15

Final
(Italy) Matteo Tagliariol	7
(France) Jérôme Jeannet	15

==== Foil individual ====
Position	Name	Country
1st place, gold medalist(s)	Andrea Baldini	Italy
2nd place, silver medalist(s)	Benjamin Kleibrink	Germany
3rd place, bronze medalist(s)	Salvatore Sanzo	Italy
3rd place, bronze medalist(s)	Erwann Le Péchoux	France
5.	Andrea Cassarà	Italy
5.	Andrey Deyev	Russia
7.	Peter Joppich	Germany
8.	Renal Ganeyev	Russia

Bracket:

Quarter-finals
(Italy) Andrea Baldini	15
(Russia) Andrey Deyev	3
(France) Erwann Le Péchoux	15
(Italy) Andrea Cassarà	14
(Italy) Salvatore Sanzo	15
(Russia) Renal Ganeyev	5
(Germany) Benjamin Kleibrink	14
(Germany) Peter Joppich	13

Semi-finals
(Italy) Andrea Baldini	15
(France) Erwann Le Péchoux	12
(Italy) Salvatore Sanzo	11
(Germany) Benjamin Kleibrink	15

Final
(Italy) Andrea Baldini	15
(Germany) Benjamin Kleibrink	13

==== Sabre individual ====
Position	Name	Country
1st place, gold medalist(s)	Jorge Pina	Spain
2nd place, silver medalist(s)	Aleksey Yakimenko	Russia
3rd place, bronze medalist(s)	Stanislav Pozdnyakov	Russia
3rd place, bronze medalist(s)	Mihai Covaliu	Romania
5.	Florin Zalomir	Romania
6.	Aldo Montano	Italy
7.	Luigi Tarantino	Italy
8.	Nicolas Lopez	France

Bracket:

Quarter-finals
(Romania) Mihai Covaliu	15
(France) Nicolas Lopez	13
(Spain) Jorge Pina	15
(Italy) Luigi Tarantino	12
(Germany) Stanislav Pozdnyakov	15
(Italy) Aldo Montano	10
(Russia) Aleksey Yakimenko	15
(Romania) Florin Zalomir	7

Semi-finals
(Romania) Mihai Covaliu	11
(Spain) Jorge Pina	15
(Russia) Stanislav Pozdnyakov	11
(Russia) Aleksey Yakimenko	15

Final
(Spain) Jorge Pina	15
(Russia) Aleksey Yakimenko	7

==== Épée team ====
Position	Country
1st place, gold medalist(s)	Hungary
2nd place, silver medalist(s)	Poland
3rd place, bronze medalist(s)	France
4.	Italy
5.	Switzerland
6.	Belarus
7.	Germany
8.	Czech Republic

Bracket:

Quarter-finals
France	45
Germany	33
Poland	38
Belarus	32
Italy	40
Czech Republic	39
Hungary	37
Switzerland	30

Semi-finals
France	34
Poland	45
Italy	20
Hungary	22

Final
Poland	33
Hungary	45
Third place
France	45
Italy	27

==== Foil team ====
Position	Country
1st place, gold medalist(s)	Germany
2nd place, silver medalist(s)	Russia
3rd place, bronze medalist(s)	Italy
4.	France
5.	Romania
6.	Ukraine
7.	Belarus
8.	Hungary

Bracket:

Quarter-finals
France	45
Hungary	28
Russia	45
Ukraine	22
Italy	45
Romania	36
Germany	38
Belarus	29

Semi-finals
France	35
Russia	45
Italy	36
Germany	43

Final
Russia	43
Germany	44
Third place
Italy	45
France	40

==== Sabre team ====
Position	Country
1st place, gold medalist(s)	Russia
2nd place, silver medalist(s)	Belarus
3rd place, bronze medalist(s)	France
4.	Ukraine
5.	Italy
6.	Hungary
7.	Germany
8.	Spain

Bracket:

Quarter-finals
France	45
Spain	29
Belarus	45
Italy	43
Russia	45
Germany	32
Ukraine	45
Hungary	42

Semi-finals
France	41
Belarus	45
Russia	45
Ukraine	44

Final
Belarus	30
Russia	45
Third place
France	45
Ukraine	43

=== Women ===
==== Épée individual ====
Position	Name	Country
1st place, gold medalist(s)	Laura Flessel-Colovic	France
2nd place, silver medalist(s)	Emma Samuelsson	Sweden
3rd place, bronze medalist(s)	Britta Heidemann	Germany
3rd place, bronze medalist(s)	Irina Embrich	Estonia
5.	Emese Szász	Hungary
6.	Sophie Lamon	Switzerland
7.	Maureen Nisima	France
8.	Tatiana Logunova	Russia

Bracket:

Quarter-finals
(Germany) Britta Heidemann	7
(France) Maureen Nisima	6
(France) Laura Flessel-Colovic	15
(Hungary) Emese Szász	11
(Estonia) Irina Embrich	15
(Switzerland) Sophie Lamon	10
(Sweden) Emma Samuelsson	15
(Russia) Tatiana Logunova	12

Semi-finals
(Germany) Britta Heidemann	9
(France) Laura Flessel-Colovic	15
(Estonia) Irina Embrich	11
(Sweden) Emma Samuelsson	15

Final
(France) Laura Flessel-Colovic	15
(Sweden) Emma Samuelsson	13

==== Foil individual ====
Position	Name	Country
1st place, gold medalist(s)	Eugyenia Lamonova	Russia
2nd place, silver medalist(s)	Valentina Vezzali	Italy
3rd place, bronze medalist(s)	Olha Leleiko	Ukraine
3rd place, bronze medalist(s)	Margherita Granbassi	Italy
5.	Cristina Ghiță	Romania
6.	Delila Hatuel	Israel
7.	Sylwia Gruchała	Poland
8.	Gabriella Varga	Hungary

Bracket:

Quarter-finals
(Italy) Margherita Granbassi	7
(Hungary) Gabriella Varga	6
(Russia) Yevgeniya Lamonova	9
(Romania) Cristina Ghiță	6
(Ukraine) Olha Leleyko	15
(Israel) Delila Hatuel	9
(Italy) Valentina Vezzali	15
(Poland) Sylwia Gruchała	10

Semi-finals
(Italy) Margherita Granbassi	6
(Russia) Yevgeniya Lamonova	7
(Ukraine) Olha Leleyko	8
(Italy) Valentina Vezzali	15

Final
(Russia) Yevgeniya Lamonova	13
(Italy) Valentina Vezzali	12

==== Sabre individual ====
Position	Name	Country
1st place, gold medalist(s)	Yekaterina Fedorkina	Russia
2nd place, silver medalist(s)	Sofiya Velikaya	Russia
3rd place, bronze medalist(s)	Orsolya Nagy	Hungary
3rd place, bronze medalist(s)	Olena Khomrova	Ukraine
5.	Yelena Nechayeva	Russia
6.	Réka Pető	Hungary
7.	Gioia Marzocca	Italy
8.	Aleksandra Socha	Poland

Bracket:

Quarter-finals
(Hungary) Orsolya Nagy	15
(Hungary) Réka Pető	6
(Russia) Yekaterina Fedorkina	15
(Poland) Aleksandra Socha	12
(Russia) Sofiya Velikaya	15
(Russia) Yelena Nechayeva	10
(Ukraine) Olena Khomrova	15
(Italy) Gioia Marzocca	10

Semi-finals
(Hungary) Orsolya Nagy	9
(Russia) Yekaterina Fedorkina	15
(Russia) Sofiya Velikaya	15
(Ukraine) Olena Khomrova	11

Final
(Russia) Yekaterina Fedorkina	15
(Russia) Sofiya Velikaya	14

==== Épée team ====
Position	Country
1st place, gold medalist(s)	Italy
2nd place, silver medalist(s)	Hungary
3rd place, bronze medalist(s)	France
4.	Poland
5.	Romania
6.	Russia
7.	Germany
8.	Ukraine

Bracket:

Quarter-finals
France	34
Russia	33
Hungary	30
Ukraine	27
Poland	20
Germany	19
Italy	45
Romania	38

Semi-finals
France	23
Hungary	39
Poland	29
Italy	44

Final
Hungary	35
Italy	37
Third place
France	35
Poland	33

==== Foil team ====
Position	Country
1st place, gold medalist(s)	Hungary
2nd place, silver medalist(s)	Russia
3rd place, bronze medalist(s)	Italy
4.	Poland
5.	Germany
6.	France
7.	Romania
8.	Ukraine

Bracket:

Quarter-finals
Italy	41
Ukraine	20
Hungary	28
France	25
Poland	40
Romania	34
Russia	39
Germany	34

Semi-finals
Italy	39
Hungary	40
Poland	43
Russia	45

Final
Hungary	45
Russia	31
Third place
Italy	45
Poland	34

==== Sabre team ====
Position	Country
1st place, gold medalist(s)	France
2nd place, silver medalist(s)	Ukraine
3rd place, bronze medalist(s)	Russia
4.	Italy
5.	Hungary
6.	Poland
7.	Great Britain
8.	Germany

Bracket:

Quarter-finals
France	45
Germany	36
Italy	45
Poland	35
Ukraine	45
Hungary	40
Russia	45
Great Britain	34

Semi-finals
France	45
Italy	42
Ukraine	45
Russia	44

Final
France	45
Ukraine	44
Third place
Russia	45
Italy	39
