= Viktoria Nikishina =

Russian foil fencer

Medal record

Representing Russia

Women's Fencing

Olympic Games
Gold medal – first place	2008 Beijing	Foil Team

Viktoria Aleksandrovna Nikishina (Russian: Виктория Александровна Никишина; born 9 September 1984 in Moscow) is a Russian foil fencer. She won a gold medal in the foil team event at the 2008 Summer Olympics.
