= Érik Boisse =

French fencer (born 1980)

Éric Boisse
Personal information
- Born: 14 March 1980 (age 46) Clichy, France

Sport
- Sport: Fencing
Medal record
Men's épée fencing
Representing France
Olympic Games
Gold medal – first place	2004 Athens	Epée team
World Championships
Silver medal – second place	2007 Saint Petersburg	Epée individual

Érik Boisse (born 13 March 1980, in Clichy) is a French épée fencer. He is the son of Philippe Boisse.

Boisse won the gold medal in the épée team event at the 2004 Summer Olympics and the 2006 World Fencing Championships after beating Spain in the final. He accomplished this with his teammates Ulrich Robeiri, Gauthier Grumier, and Fabrice Jeannet.

== Achievements ==
2006 World Fencing Championships, team épée
