= Maarika Võsu =

Estonian fencer (born 1972)

Personal information
- Born: 7 June 1972 (age 54) Tartu, then part of Estonian SSR, Soviet Union

Sport
- Sport: Fencing
Medal record
Representing Estonia
Women's fencing
World Championships
Silver medal – second place	2002 Lisbon	Team épée
Silver medal – second place	2005 Leipzig	Épée
Bronze medal – third place	1995 The Hague	Team épée
European Championships
Silver medal – second place	2003 Bourges	Team épée
Silver medal – second place	2003 Bourges	Épée

Maarika Võsu (born 7 June 1972) is an Estonian fencer. She competed in the individual and team épée events at the 1996 Summer Olympics.

Awards
Preceded by Kristina Šmigun	Estonian Sportswoman of the Year; 2005	Succeeded by Kristina Šmigun
