= Cristina Ghiță =

Romanian fencer (born 1982)

Personal information
- Born: 16 December 1982 (age 43)

Fencing career
- Sport: Fencing
- Country: Romania
- Weapon: foil
- Hand: Right-handed
- Club: CSA Steaua București
- Retired: 2012
- FIE ranking: current ranking
Medal record
Women' Foil
Representing Romania
World Championships
Silver medal – second place	2005 Leipzig	Team Foil
European Championships
Silver medal – second place	2006 İzmir	Team Foil

Cristina Ghiță (born 16 December 1982) is a retired Romanian foil fencer, team silver medallist in the 2002 European Championships and in the 2005 World Championships.

== Career ==
Ghiță joined the national team in the 2004–05 season. At the 2005 World Championships Romania created an upset by defeating in the quarter-finals the Italian team led by Valentina Vezzali. They overcame Hungary, but were edged out 20–19 by South Korea and came away with a silver medal. The next season, Romania won the silver medal in the 2006 European Championships in İsmir after losing to Russia in overtime.

In the 2008–09 season, Romania placed 4th in the World Championships in Antalya after being defeated by Italy in the semi-final, then by Germany in the match for the bronze medal. The year after, Romania were knocked out by Venezuela in the first round of the World Championships in Paris. The lack of results and funds pushed the Romanian Fencing Federation into dissolving the national foil team in early 2011.

Ghiță retired from international competition after the 2011–12 season. She won the 2013 Romanian national championship after defeating fellow Stelist Mălina Călugăreanu.
