= 2004 European Fencing Championships =

The 2004 European Fencing Championships were held in Copenhagen. The event took place from 29 June to 4 July 2004.

== Medal summary ==
=== Men's events ===
| Event | Gold | Silver | Bronze |
|---|---|---|---|
| Foil | Richard Breutner (GER) | Renal Ganeyev (RUS) | Michael Ludwig (AUT); Andrzej Witkowski (POL) |
| Épée | Christoph Marik (AUT) | Remy Delhomme (FRA) | Robert Andrzejuk (POL); Pavel Kolobkov (RUS) |
| Sabre | Stanislav Pozdnyakov (RUS) | Marcin Koniusz (POL) | Sergey Sharikov (RUS); Aleksey Yakimenko (RUS) |
| Team Foil | Russia | Poland | Italy |
| Team Épée | Switzerland | Poland | Sweden |
| Team Sabre | Russia | Poland | Ukraine |

=== Women's events ===
| Event | Gold | Silver | Bronze |
|---|---|---|---|
| Foil | Laura Badea-Cârlescu (ROU) | Svetlana Boyko (RUS) | Claudia Pigliapoco (ITA); Anna Rybicka (POL) |
| Épée | Natalia Konrad (UKR) | Anna Sivkova (RUS) | Hajnalka Tóth (HUN); Oksana Yermakova (RUS) |
| Sabre | Aleksandra Socha (POL) | Yekaterina Fedorkina (RUS) | Ilaria Bianco (ITA); Cătălina Gheorghițoaia (ROU) |
| Team Foil | Romania | Russia | Italy |
| Team Épée | Russia | Hungary | Poland |
| Team Sabre | Russia | Romania | Italy |

=== Medal table ===
| Rank | Nation | Gold | Silver | Bronze | Total |
|---|---|---|---|---|---|
| 1 | Russia | 5 | 5 | 4 | 14 |
| 2 | Romania | 2 | 1 | 1 | 4 |
| 3 | Poland | 1 | 4 | 4 | 9 |
| 4 | Austria | 1 | 0 | 1 | 2 |
| 4 | Ukraine | 1 | 0 | 1 | 2 |
| 6 | Germany | 1 | 0 | 0 | 1 |
| 6 | Switzerland | 1 | 0 | 0 | 1 |
| 8 | Hungary | 0 | 1 | 1 | 2 |
| 9 | France | 0 | 1 | 0 | 1 |
| 10 | Italy | 0 | 0 | 5 | 5 |
| 11 | Sweden | 0 | 0 | 1 | 1 |
| Totals (11 entries) | | 12 | 12 | 18 | 42 |
