= Cécile Argiolas =

French fencer

Personal information
- Born: 6 July 1976 (age 50) Toulouse, France

Sport
- Sport: Fencing

Cécile Argiolas (born 6 July 1976) is a French fencer. She competed in the women's individual sabre event at the 2004 Summer Olympics.
