= Andrey Deyev =

Russian fencer

Personal information
- Born: 20 January 1978 (age 48) Yekaterinburg, Russia

Sport
- Country: Russia
- Sport: Fencing
- Event: Foil
Medal record
Men's fencing
Representing Russia
World Championships
Bronze medal – third place	2005 Leipzig	Individual foil

Andrey Deyev (Russian: Андрей Деев; born 20 January 1978) is a Russian former fencer. He competed in the individual and team foil events at the 2000 Summer Olympics.
