= Gioia Marzocca =

Italian fencer (born 1979)

Personal information
- Born: 22 June 1979 (age 47) Lecco, Italy

Sport
- Sport: Fencing
- Event: Sabre
Medal record
Women's Fencing
European Championships
Bronze medal – third place	2012 Legnano	Team Sabre

Gioia Marzocca (born 22 June 1979) is an Italian fencer. She competed in the women's individual sabre events at the 2004, 2008 and 2012 Summer Olympics but did not medal on any occasion.
