= Cristina Stahl =

Romanian fencer

Personal information
- Nationality: Romania
- Born: 9 April 1978 (age 48) Bucharest, Romania
- Height: 1.69 m (5 ft 6 1/2 in)
- Weight: 58 kg (128 lb)

Sport
- Sport: Fencing
- Event: Foil
- Club: CSA Steaua Bucuresti
- Coached by: Ducu Petre

Cristina Stahl (born April 9, 1978, in Bucharest) is a Romanian foil fencer. She is the daughter of five-time Olympian Ecaterina Stahl-Iencic, who won two bronze medals for the team foil at the 1968 Summer Olympics in Mexico City, and at the 1972 Summer Olympics in Munich. She is also a member of CSA Steaua Bucuresti in Bucharest, and is coached and trained by Ducu Petre.

At age thirty, Stahl made her official debut for the 2008 Summer Olympics in Beijing, where she competed in the women's individual foil event. She received a bye for the second preliminary round, before losing out to Germany's Katja Wächter, with a score of 6–15.
