= Yelena Nechayeva =

Russian fencer

Personal information
- Born: 14 June 1979 (age 47) Saint Petersburg, Russia

Sport
- Sport: Fencing

Yelena Nechayeva (born 14 June 1979) is a Russian former fencer. She competed in the women's sabre events at the 2004 and 2008 Summer Olympics.
