= Fencing at the 2004 Summer Olympics – Men's épée =

Olympic fencing event

Men's épée at the Games of the XXVIII Olympiad
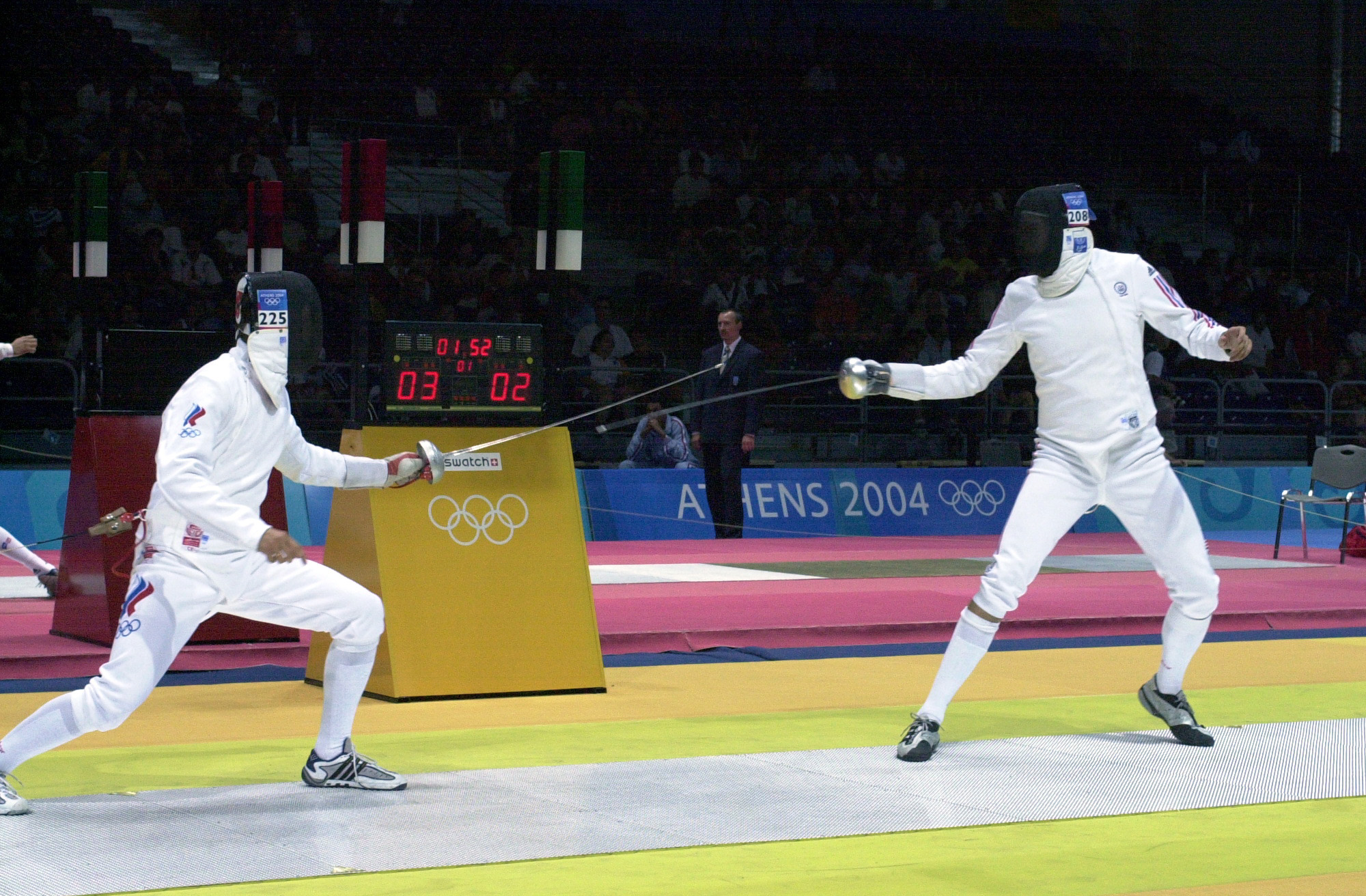
- Round of 32 bout between Tourchine (RUS) and Kelsey (USA)
- Venue: Helliniko Olympic Complex
- Date: August 17, 2004
- Competitors: 37 from 21 nations

Medalists
1st place, gold medalist(s)		Marcel Fischer	Switzerland
2nd place, silver medalist(s)		Wang Lei	China
3rd place, bronze medalist(s)		Pavel Kolobkov	Russia

The men's épée was a competition in fencing at the 2004 Summer Olympics in Athens. A total of 37 men from 21 nations competed in this event. Each nation was limited to 3 fencers. Competition took place in the Fencing Hall at the Helliniko Olympic Complex on August 17. The event was won by Marcel Fischer of Switzerland, the nation's first victory in the event and first medal of any color since 1952. Wang Lei's silver was China's first medal in the men's individual épée. Defending champion Pavel Kolobkov earned bronze, finishing a set of three different-colored Olympic medals in the event (silver in 1992, gold in 2000). Kolobkov was the fourth man to earn three medals in the event and had the best record of any of the four; only Ramón Fonst (with two gold medals) had more individual Olympic success in the men's épée. It was the fifth consecutive Games in which a Russian fencer reached the podium, including medals for Russian fencers competing for the Soviet Union (1988) and Unified Team (1992).

== Background ==
This was the 24th appearance of the event, which was not held at the first Games in 1896 (with only foil and sabre events held) but has been held at every Summer Olympics since 1900.

Four of the eight quarterfinalists from 2000 returned: gold medalist (and 1992 silver medalist) Pavel Kolobkov of Russia, silver medalist Hugues Obry of France, fourth-place finisher Marcel Fischer of Switzerland, and eighth-place finisher Zhao Gang of China. The reigning (2003) World Champion was Fabrice Jeannet of France; Kolobkov (1993, 1994, and 2002) and Obry (1998) were also prior World Champions.

Algeria made its debut in the event. France and the United States each appeared for the 22nd time, tied for most among nations.

== Competition format ==
The competition continued to use the entirely single-elimination (with bronze medal match) format introduced in 1996. All bouts were to 15 touches.

== Schedule ==
All times are Greece Standard Time (UTC+2)

Date	Time	Round
Tuesday, 17 August 2004	12:00; 13:00; 15:00; 16:10; 19:25; 20:45	Preliminary round Round of 32; Round of 16; Quarterfinals; Semifinals; Final; Bronze medal match

== Results ==
=== Preliminary round ===
As there were more than 32 entrants in this event, five first round matches were held to reduce the field to 32 fencers.

Ahmed Nabil (EGY)	15—6	Georges Ambalof (GRE)
Siriroj Rathprasert (THA)	15—13	Mohanad Saif El Din Sabry (EGY)
Dmitriy Karuchenko (UKR)	15—6	Abderrahmane Daidj (ALG)
Alexandru Nyisztor (ROU)	15—6	Bogdan Nikishin (UKR)
Serguey Kotchetkov (RUS)	15—6	Rami Assiam (MAR)

=== Main tournament bracket ===
The remaining field of 32 fencers competed in a single-elimination tournament to determine the medal winners. Semifinal losers proceeded to a bronze medal match.

Round of 32
Fischer (SUI)	15
Nabil (EGY)	10
Kovács (HUN)	15
Mattern (USA)	6
Fernandez (VEN)	15
Xie (CHN)	13
Gang (CHN)	15
Mahmoud (EGY)	9
Boisse (FRA)	15
Rathprasert (THA)	9
Carillo (CUB)	15
Obry (FRA)	10
Jeannet (FRA)	15
Kotchetkov (RUS)	11
Lee (KOR)	15
Khvorost (UKR)	11
Wang (CHN)	15
Boczkó (HUN)	10
Schmid (GER)	15
Fiedler (GER)	12
Strigel (GER)	15
Imre (HUN)	13
Karuchenko (UKR)	15
Marik (AUT)	7
Kolobkov (RUS)	15
Robinson (AUS)	5
Tourchine (RUS)	15
Kelsey (USA)	11
Thompson (USA)	13
Inostroza (CHI)	12
Rota (ITA)	15
Nyisztor (ROU)	8

Round of 16
Fischer (SUI)	15
Kovács (HUN)	7
Fernandez (VEN)	15
Gang (CHN)	12
Boisse (FRA)	15
Carillo (CUB)	11
Jeannet (FRA)	15
Lee (KOR)	5
Wang (CHN)	15
Schmid (GER)	11
Strigel (GER)	15
Karuchenko (UKR)	12
Kolobkov (RUS)	15
Tourchine (RUS)	10
Thompson (USA)	15
Rota (ITA)	13

Quarterfinals
Fischer (SUI)	15
Fernandez (VEN)	13
Boisse (FRA)	15
Jeannet (FRA)	14
Wang (CHN)	15
Strigel (GER)	14
Kolobkov (RUS)	15
Thompson (USA)	11

Semifinals
Fischer (SUI)	15
Boisse (FRA)	9
Wang (CHN)	15
Kolobkov (RUS)	10

Gold medal final
Fischer (SUI)	15
Wang (CHN)	9
Bronze medal final
Kolobkov (RUS)	15
Boisse (FRA)	8

== Results summary ==
Rank	Fencer	Nation
1st place, gold medalist(s)	Marcel Fischer	Switzerland
2nd place, silver medalist(s)	Wang Lei	China
3rd place, bronze medalist(s)	Pavel Kolobkov	Russia
4	Érik Boisse	France
5	Fabrice Jeannet	France
6	Silvio Fernández	Venezuela
7	Soren Thompson	United States
8	Daniel Strigel	Germany
9	Alfredo Rota	Italy
10	Zhao Gang	China
11	Sven Schmid	Germany
12	Lee Sang-Yeop	South Korea
13	Iván Kovács	Hungary
14	Andres Carillo Ayala	Cuba
15	Igor Turchin	Russia
16	Dmytro Kariuchenko	Ukraine
17	Christoph Marik	Austria
18	Gábor Boczkó	Hungary
19	Seth Kelsey	United States
20	Hugues Obry	France
21	Géza Imre	Hungary
22	Cody Mattern	United States
23	Paris Inostroza	Chile
24	Maksym Khvorost	Ukraine
25	Jörg Fiedler	Germany
26	Seamus Robinson	Australia
27	Xie Yongjun	China
28	Yasser Mahmoud	Egypt
29	Sergey Kochetkov	Russia
30	Ahmed Nabil	Egypt
31	Alexandru Nyisztor	Romania
32	Siriroj Rathprasert	Thailand
33	Muhannad Saif El-Din	Egypt
34	Bohdan Nikishyn	Ukraine
35	Giorgos Abalof	Greece
36	Aissam Rami	Morocco
37	Abderrahmane Daidj	Algeria
