= Men's épée at the 2013 World Fencing Championships =

The Men's épée event of the 2013 World Fencing Championships was held on August 8, 2013. The qualification was held on August 6, 2013.

== Medalists ==
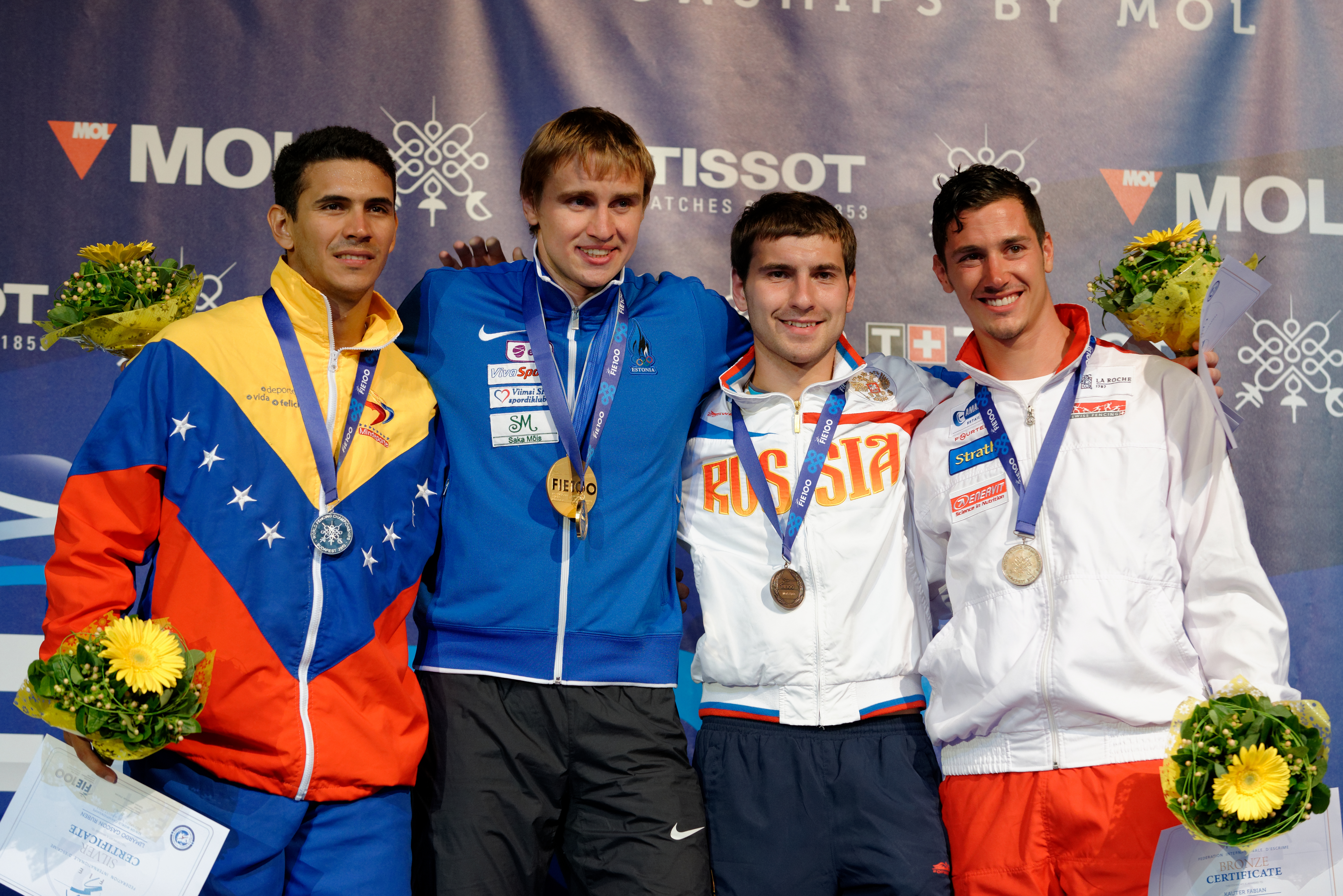
On the podium: from left to right, Rubén Limardo, Nikolai Novosjolov, Pavel Sukhov, and Fabian Kauter

Gold	Nikolai Novosjolov (EST)
Silver	Rubén Limardo (VEN)
Bronze	Fabian Kauter (SUI)
Bronze	Pavel Sukhov (RUS)

== Draw ==
=== Finals ===
Semi-finals
18:30
(Venezuela) Rubén Limardo	15
(Switzerland) Fabian Kauter	7
18:55
(Estonia) Nikolai Novosjolov	15
(Russia) Pavel Sukhov	14

Final
20:30
(Venezuela) Rubén Limardo	7
(Estonia) Nikolai Novosjolov	15

=== Top half ===
==== Section 1 ====
Round of 64
1	(Venezuela) Rubén Limardo	10
64	(Canada) Marc-Antoine Blais-Belanger	6
33	(Spain) Yulen Pereira	14
32	(Switzerland) Benjamin Steffen	13
17	(Netherlands) Bas Verwijlen	15
48	(Chile) Paris Inostroza	11
49	(Denmark) Patrick Jørgensen	10
16	(Russia) Anton Avdeev	15
9	(Ukraine) Bohdan Nikishyn	14
56	(Spain) José Luis Abajo	15
41	(Latvia) Mihails Jefremenko	13
24	(Hungary) András Rédli	15
25	(Estonia) Sten Priinits	7
40	(South Korea) Kim Sang-Min	15
57	(Israel) Ido Ajzenstadt	4
8	(Hungary) Gábor Boczkó	15

Round of 32
1	(Venezuela) Rubén Limardo	15
33	(Spain) Yulen Pereira	9
17	(Netherlands) Bas Verwijlen	11
16	(Russia) Anton Avdeev	10
56	(Spain) José Luis Abajo	12
24	(Hungary) András Rédli	15
40	(South Korea) Kim Sang-Min	11
8	(Hungary) Gábor Boczkó	15

Round of 16
1	(Venezuela) Rubén Limardo	9
17	(Netherlands) Bas Verwijlen	8
24	(Hungary) András Rédli	13
8	(Hungary) Gábor Boczkó	15

Quarterfinals
1	(Venezuela) Rubén Limardo	15
8	(Hungary) Gábor Boczkó	9

==== Section 2 ====
Round of 64
5	(Switzerland) Fabian Kauter	15
60	(Kazakhstan) Dmitriy Gryaznov	12
37	(Poland) Tomasz Motyka	10
28	(Sweden) Robin Kase	15
21	(Hungary) Péter Szényi	14
44	(Finland) Niko Vuorinen	15
53	(Singapore) Lim Wei Wen	10
12	(France) Ulrich Robeiri	15
13	(France) Alexandre Blaszyck	15
52	(Serbia) Danilo Nikolić	13
45	(Finland) Kasper Roslander	14
20	(Poland) Radosław Zawrotniak	15
29	(Hong Kong) Leung Ka Ming	8
36	(Czech Republic) Jiří Beran	15
61	(Egypt) Ahmed El-Saghir	7
4	(Germany) Jörg Fiedler	15

Round of 32
5	(Switzerland) Fabian Kauter	15
28	(Sweden) Robin Kase	10
44	(Finland) Niko Vuorinen	15
12	(France) Ulrich Robeiri	14
13	(France) Alexandre Blaszyck	11
20	(Poland) Radosław Zawrotniak	13
36	(Czech Republic) Jiří Beran	4
4	(Germany) Jörg Fiedler	15

Round of 16
5	(Switzerland) Fabian Kauter	15
44	(Finland) Niko Vuorinen	6
20	(Poland) Radosław Zawrotniak	15
4	(Germany) Jörg Fiedler	14

Quarterfinals
5	(Switzerland) Fabian Kauter	10
20	(Poland) Radosław Zawrotniak	8

=== Bottom half ===
==== Section 3 ====
Round of 64
3	(Venezuela) Silvio Fernández	10
62	(Japan) Keisuke Sakamoto	9
35	(Ukraine) Dmytro Karyuchenko	11
30	(Kazakhstan) Dmitriy Alexanin	15
19	(Italy) Matteo Tagliariol	15
46	(Belarus) Vitali Sokolovski	13
51	(South Korea) Song Jae-Ho	15
14	(France) Daniel Jerent	11
11	(France) Iván Trevejo	15
54	(Israel) Yuval Freilich	9
43	(Ukraine) Anatoliy Herey	9
22	(Italy) Enrico Garozzo	15
27	(Venezuela) Francisco Limardo	3
38	(Germany) Norman Ackermann	7
59	(Chile) Rolf Nickel	8
6	(Estonia) Nikolai Novosjolov	15

Round of 32
3	(Venezuela) Silvio Fernández	13
30	(Kazakhstan) Dmitriy Alexanin	15
19	(Italy) Matteo Tagliariol	14
51	(South Korea) Song Jae-Ho	15
11	(France) Iván Trevejo	11
22	(Italy) Enrico Garozzo	15
38	(Germany) Norman Ackermann	8
6	(Estonia) Nikolai Novosjolov	15

Round of 16
30	(Kazakhstan) Dmitriy Alexanin	15
51	(South Korea) Song Jae-Ho	12
22	(Italy) Enrico Garozzo	11
6	(Estonia) Nikolai Novosjolov	15

Quarterfinals
30	(Kazakhstan) Dmitriy Alexanin	13
6	(Estonia) Nikolai Novosjolov	15

==== Section 4 ====
Round of 64
7	(Norway) Bartosz Piasecki	10
58	(Japan) Kazuyasu Minobe	15
39	(China) Liu Qiang	12
26	(Russia) Pavel Sukhov	15
23	(Canada) Tigran Bajgoric	15
42	(Slovenia) Jan Golobič	11
55	(Ukraine) Oleg Sokolov	15
10	(Kazakhstan) Elmir Alimzhanov	13
15	(Italy) Paolo Pizzo	14
50	(Hungary) Géza Imre	15
47	(Poland) Krzysztof Mikołajczak	12
18	(Canada) Vincent Pelletier	15
31	(Netherlands) Tristan Tulen	14
34	(Germany) Falk Spautz	15
63	(Romania) Alexandru Nyisztor	14
2	(Switzerland) Max Heinzer	15

Round of 32
58	(Japan) Kazuyasu Minobe	14
26	(Russia) Pavel Sukhov	15
23	(Canada) Tigran Bajgoric	14
55	(Ukraine) Oleg Sokolov	15
50	(Hungary) Géza Imre	6
18	(Canada) Vincent Pelletier	15
34	(Germany) Falk Spautz	15
2	(Switzerland) Max Heinzer	13

Round of 16
26	(Russia) Pavel Sukhov	15
55	(Ukraine) Oleg Sokolov	10
18	(Canada) Vincent Pelletier	9
34	(Germany) Falk Spautz	15

Quarterfinals
26	(Russia) Pavel Sukhov	15
34	(Germany) Falk Spautz	14

== Final classification ==
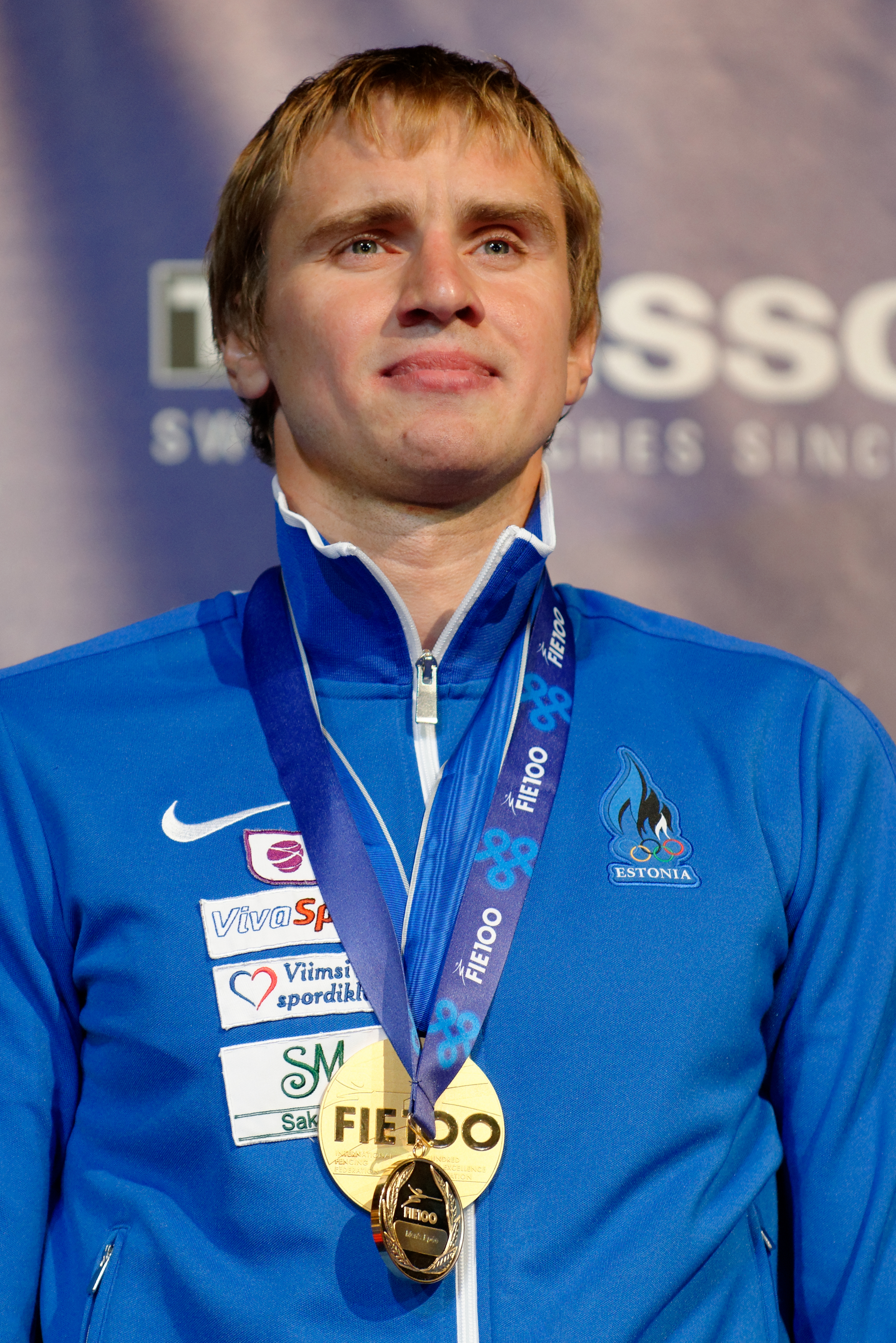
2013 World Champion Nikolai Novosjolov

Rank	Athlete	Nation
1st place, gold medalist(s)	Nikolai Novosjolov	Estonia
2nd place, silver medalist(s)	Rubén Limardo	Venezuela
3rd place, bronze medalist(s)	Fabian Kauter	Switzerland
3rd place, bronze medalist(s)	Pavel Sukhov	Russia
5	Gábor Boczkó	Hungary
6	Radosław Zawrotniak	Poland
7	Dmitriy Alexanin	Kazakhstan
8	Falk Spautz	Germany
9	Jörg Fiedler	Germany
10	Bas Verwijlen	Netherlands
11	Vincent Pelletier	Canada
12	Enrico Garozzo	Italy
13	András Rédli	Hungary
14	Niko Vuorinen	Finland
15	Song Jae-Ho	South Korea
16	Oleg Sokolov	Ukraine
17	Max Heinzer	Switzerland
18	Silvio Fernández	Venezuela
19	Ulrich Robeiri	France
20	Iván Trevejo	France
21	Alexandre Blaszczyk	France
22	Anton Avdeev	Russia
23	Matteo Tagliariol	Italy
24	Tigran Bajgoric	Canada
25	Robin Kase	Sweden
26	Yulen Pereira	Spain
27	Jiří Beran	Czech Republic
28	Norman Ackermann	Germany
29	Kim Sang-Min	South Korea
30	Géza Imre	Hungary
31	José Luis Abajo	Spain
32	Kazuyasu Minobe	Japan
33	Bartosz Piasecki	Norway
34	Bohdan Nikishyn	Ukraine
35	Elmir Alimzhanov	Kazakhstan
36	Daniel Jerent	France
37	Paolo Pizzo	Italy
38	Péter Szényi	Hungary
39	Sten Priinits	Estonia
40	Francisco Limardo	Venezuela
41	Leung Ka Ming	Hong Kong
42	Tristan Tulen	Netherlands
43	Benjamin Steffen	Switzerland
44	Dmytro Karyuchenko	Ukraine
45	Tomasz Motyka	Poland
46	Liu Chang	China
47	Mihails Jefremenko	Latvia
48	Jan Golobič	Slovenia
49	Anatoliy Herey	Ukraine
50	Kasper Roslander	Finland
51	Vitali Sokolovski	Belarus
52	Krzysztof Mikolajczak	Poland
53	Paris Inostroza	Chile
54	Patrick Jørgensen	Denmark
55	Danilo Nikolić	Serbia
56	Lim Wei Wen	Singapore
57	Yuval Freilich	Israel
58	Ido Ajzenstadt	Israel
59	Rolf Nickel	Chile
60	Dmitriy Gryaznov	Kazakhstan
61	Ahmed El-Saghir	Egypt
62	Keisuke Sakamoto	Japan
63	Alexandru Nyisztor	Romania
64	Marc-Antoine Blais-Belanger	Canada
65	Mohannad Saif	Egypt
66	Jesús Andrés Lugonés Ruggeri	Argentina
67	Steffen Launer	Germany
68	Satoru Uyama	Japan
69	Sturla Torkildsen	Norway
70	Kelvin Cañas	Venezuela
71	Adrian Pop	Romania
72	Alexander Lahtinen	Finland
73	Martin Čapek	Czech Republic
74	Fredrik Backer	Norway
75	Na Jong-Kwan	South Korea
76	Ido Herpe	Israel
77	Jüri Salm	Estonia
78	Mahmoud Mohsen	Egypt
79	Richard Grünhäuser	Brazil
80	Alexander Tsinis	United States
81	Hamed Sedaghaty	Iran
82	Gustavo Coqueco	Colombia
83	Ruslan Kurbanov	Kazakhstan
84	Ivan Baumgartner	Brazil
84	Jan Bidovec	Slovenia
86	Richard Pokorny	Czech Republic
87	Max Rod	Portugal
88	Zacharie Herve Roger	Morocco
89	Yoshiki Hirano	Japan
90	Joaquim Videira	Portugal
91	James Lewis	Australia
92	Troels Christian Robl	Denmark
93	Michał Adamek	Poland
94	José Félix Domínguez	Argentina
95	Štefan Cipár	Slovakia
96	Julian Seidl	Czech Republic
97	Nicolas Ferreira	Brazil
98	Fong Kiu	Hong Kong
99	Soren Thompson	United States
100	Igor Tourchine	Russia
101	Grigori Beskin	Israel
102	Aissam Rami	Morocco
103	Frederik von der Osten	Denmark
104	Pau Roselló	Spain
105	Vadim Anokhin	Russia
106	Ricardo Candeias	Portugal
107	Teemu Seeve	Finland
108	Jason Pryor	United States
109	Florian Staub	Switzerland
110	Nikolay Tchaldin	Lithuania
111	Kweon Young-Jun	South Korea
112	Alexander Chernykh	Kyrgyzstan
113	Thomas Ertzeid	Norway
114	Adam Watson	United States
115	Arturo Isaac Dorati Ameglio	Panama
116	João Cordeiro	Portugal
117	Ringo Quintero Álvarez	Cuba
118	Roman Aleksandrov	Uzbekistan
118	Ryan Aaron Rodríguez Suárez	Mexico
120	Evgeny Naumkin	Kyrgyzstan
121	Diego Confalonieri	Italy
122	Deyan Dobrev	Bulgaria
123	Andrés Felipe Campos Zarate	Colombia
124	Abdelkarim El-Haouari	Morocco
125	Lee Samson Mun Hou	Singapore
126	Elías Casado	Spain
126	Khaled Buhdeima	Libya
128	Omar Carrillo	Mexico
129	Kanan Aliyev	Azerbaijan
130	Bertalan Árkosi	Romania
131	Peter Toshkov	Bulgaria
132	Carlos Enrique Covani	Argentina
133	Mohammad Rezaei	Iran
134	Satya Gunput	Mauritius
135	Mohammad Esmaeili	Iran
136	Ruslan Kudayev	Uzbekistan
137	Martín Barreto	Uruguay
138	Wang Chi-Chu	Chinese Taipei
139	Georges Ambalof	Greece
140	Mikael Mikaelian	Georgia
141	Erick Trujillo	Mexico
142	Alin Sbarcia	Romania
143	Robrecht Van Cleemput	Belgium
144	Roman Petrov	Kyrgyzstan
145	Tomas Krasikovas	Lithuania
146	Batkhuu Bayarsaikhan	Mongolia
147	Fahed Hasan	Kuwait
148	François Xavier Ferot	Belgium
149	Robert Koman	Slovenia
149	Roberto Jaffet Pineda Villanueva	El Salvador
151	Martin Stoev	Bulgaria
152	Chen Yadong	China
153	Ross Austen	Australia
154	Klaus Albert Canin	Denmark
155	Jack Hudson	Great Britain
156	Javier Suárez	Colombia
157	Yusuf Bojte	Turkey
158	Guilherme Melaragno	Brazil
159	Matej Karkalik	Slovakia
160	William Bishop	New Zealand
161	Georges Nakis	Greece
162	William Dolley	Australia
163	Rolland Mouflard	Monaco
164	Ahmet Agayev	Turkmenistan
165	Javgenij Stalmakov	Lithuania
166	Rustam Nasimov	Tajikistan
167	Igor Knyazev	Uzbekistan
168	Okan Karadeniz	Turkey
169	Kiril Marinov	Bulgaria
170	Abdullah Albeloushi	Kuwait
171	Vyacheslav Voronin	Turkmenistan
172	Luka Gujinović	Croatia
173	Sven Järve	Estonia
173	Dino Sourek	Croatia
175	Lai Clarence Ka Tsun	Hong Kong
176	Alex Landavere	Peru
177	Hughes Boisvert-Simard	Canada
178	Idrissa Youssou Mamar Diop	Nigeria
179	Danushman Djumabay Uluu	Kyrgyzstan
180	Nikolaos Xynos	Greece
181	Matteo Barchiesi	Australia
182	Gints Bakis	Latvia
182	Nurmurad Durdiev	Turkmenistan
184	Joaquín Quintas	Uruguay
185	Mauricio Ospina	Ecuador
186	Tong Chun Kit Jonathan	Hong Kong
187	José Luis Moran	Panama
187	Ivan Lovrić	Croatia
189	Luka Nikolić	Serbia
190	Gayrat Khamitov	Uzbekistan
191	Luka Matić	Croatia
191	Yue Jinhua	China
191	Herve Edongo Eloungou	Cameroon
194	Rok Sobočan	Slovenia
195	Batsuuri Battumur	Mongolia
196	Foo Daniel Qi Yang	Singapore
197	Miloš Milić	Serbia
198	Alexander Gejmovský	Slovakia
199	Travis Stevens	Bermuda
200	Byashim Durdyev	Turkmenistan
201	Normunds Kalnins	Latvia
202	Kurt Matthew Straker	Barbados
203	Jonathan Rush	Namibia
203	Kosmas Karakolis	Greece
205	Jigjidsuren Tsoggerel	Mongolia
206	Juan Estebán Guarderas	Ecuador
206	Peter Roser	Bermuda
