= Men's épée at the 2011 World Fencing Championships =

The Men's épée event of the 2011 World Fencing Championships took place on October 12, 2011.

== Medalists ==
Gold	Paolo Pizzo (ITA)
Silver	Bas Verwijlen (NED)
Bronze	Fabian Kauter (SUI)
Bronze	Park Kyoung-doo (KOR)

== Draw ==
=== Finals ===
Semi-finals
(Switzerland) Fabian Kauter	12
(Italy) Paolo Pizzo	15
(South Korea) Park Kyoung-doo	11
(Netherlands) Bas Verwijlen	15

Final
(Italy) Paolo Pizzo	15
(Netherlands) Bas Verwijlen	13

=== Top half ===
==== Section 1 ====
Round of 64
(France) Gauthier Grumier	15
(Estonia) Juri Salm	5
(Kazakhstan) Elmir Alimzhanov	15
(Canada) Tigran Bajgoric	13
(Russia) Anton Avdeev	9
(Australia) Seamus Robinson	15
(United States) Benjamin Bratton	14
(Italy) Alfredo Rota	15
(Switzerland) Fabian Kauter	15
(Netherlands) Tristan Tulen	12
(China) Yin Lianchi	13
(South Korea) Jung Jin-sun	15
(Canada) Vincent Pelletier	13
(Japan) Shogo Nishida	15
(Iran) Ali Yaghoubian	13
(France) Jean-Michel Lucenay	15

Round of 32
(France) Gauthier Grumier	14
(Kazakhstan) Elmir Alimzhanov	15
(Australia) Seamus Robinson	12
(Italy) Alfredo Rota	15
(Switzerland) Fabian Kauter	15
(South Korea) Jung Jin-sun	8
(Japan) Shogo Nishida	13
(France) Jean-Michel Lucenay	15

Round of 16
(Kazakhstan) Elmir Alimzhanov	15
(Italy) Alfredo Rota	13
(Switzerland) Fabian Kauter	15
(France) Jean-Michel Lucenay	14

Quarterfinals
(Kazakhstan) Elmir Alimzhanov	11
(Switzerland) Fabian Kauter	15

==== Section 2 ====
Round of 64
(Hungary) Géza Imre	15
(Egypt) Ahmed El Saghir	9
(Romania) Alexandru Nyisztor	12
(Norway) Sturla Torkildsen	14
(Portugal) Joaquim Videira	15
(Venezuela) Silvio Fernández	12
(Canada) Hugues Boisvert-Simard	15
(Russia) Pavel Sukhov	13
(Italy) Paolo Pizzo	15
(Finland) Alexander Lahtinen	7
(Ukraine) Anatoliy Herey	15
(Switzerland) Benjamin Steffen	13
(Hungary) Péter Somfai	11
(Norway) Bartosz Piasecki	15
(United States) Soren Thompson	15
(Hungary) Gábor Boczkó	9

Round of 32
(Hungary) Géza Imre	15
(Norway) Sturla Torkildsen	14
(Portugal) Joaquim Videira	6
(Canada) Hugues Boisvert-Simard	15
(Italy) Paolo Pizzo	15
(Ukraine) Anatoliy Herey	11
(Norway) Bartosz Piasecki	8
(United States) Soren Thompson	15

Round of 16
(Hungary) Géza Imre	15
(Canada) Hugues Boisvert-Simard	14
(Italy) Paolo Pizzo	15
(United States) Soren Thompson	9

Quarterfinals
(Hungary) Géza Imre	11
(Italy) Paolo Pizzo	15

=== Bottom half ===
==== Section 3 ====
Round of 64
(Estonia) Nikolai Novosjolov	15
(Poland) Robert Andrzejuk	4
(Czech Republic) Jiří Beran	15
(Spain) Mario Hernández	7
(Ukraine) Dmitriy Karuchenko	15
(Belarus) Artsiom Chartovich	8
(Hong Kong) Tsui Yiu Chung	7
(United States) Weston Kelsey	13
(Germany) Martin Schmitt	13
(Russia) Igor Turchin	15
(Venezuela) Kelvin Cañas	10
(France) Yannick Borel	15
(Denmark) Frederik von der Osten	5
(United States) Cody Mattern	15
(South Korea) Park Kyoung-doo	15
(Italy) Matteo Tagliariol	13

Round of 32
(Estonia) Nikolai Novosjolov	15
(Czech Republic) Jiří Beran	6
(Ukraine) Dmitriy Karuchenko	6
(United States) Weston Kelsey	7
(Russia) Igor Turchin	14
(France) Yannick Borel	15
(United States) Cody Mattern	1
(South Korea) Park Kyoung-doo	5

Round of 16
(Estonia) Nikolai Novosjolov	10
(United States) Weston Kelsey	9
(France) Yannick Borel	7
(South Korea) Park Kyoung-doo	15

Quarterfinals
(Estonia) Nikolai Novosjolov	8
(South Korea) Park Kyoung-doo	15

==== Section 4 ====
Round of 64
(Switzerland) Max Heinzer	15
(Estonia) Sten Priinits	10
(South Korea) Jung Seung-hwa	7
(Poland) Radosław Zawrotniak	15
(France) Ronan Gustin	15
(China) Wang Lei	11
(China) Li Guojie	11
(Venezuela) Rubén Limardo	15
(Netherlands) Bas Verwijlen	15
(Romania) Adrian Pop	11
(Kazakhstan) Ruslan Kurbanov	15
(Ukraine) Bohdan Nikishyn	14
(Poland) Piotr Kruczek	13
(Senegal) Alexandre Bouzaid	15
(Sweden) Anton Samuelsson	11
(Germany) Jörg Fiedler	15

Round of 32
(Switzerland) Max Heinzer	12
(Poland) Radosław Zawrotniak	15
(France) Ronan Gustin	9
(Venezuela) Rubén Limardo	15
(Netherlands) Bas Verwijlen	15
(Kazakhstan) Ruslan Kurbanov	11
(Senegal) Alexandre Bouzaid	4
(Germany) Jörg Fiedler	3

Round of 16
(Poland) Radosław Zawrotniak	8
(Venezuela) Rubén Limardo	15
(Netherlands) Bas Verwijlen	15
(Senegal) Alexandre Bouzaid	11

Quarterfinals
(Venezuela) Rubén Limardo	8
(Netherlands) Bas Verwijlen	15
