= 2009–10 Fencing World Cup =

International fencing competition

The 39th FIE Fencing World Cup began in October 2009 and concluded in November 2010 at the 2010 World Fencing Championships held in Paris.

== Individual Épée ==
=== Men's épée ===
Color key

- Zone Championships
- Grand Prix
- World Cup
- Satellite

Date	Event	Type	Gold	Silver	Bronze
11 October 2009	51 Trophy of Belgrade, Belgrade	Satellite	Deyan Dobrev (BUL)	Marin Dorian Pirvan (ROU)	Bartłomiej Język (POL); Dávid Losonczy (HUN)
17 October 2009	Kupittaa tournament, Turku	Satellite	Joar Sundman (SWE)	Niko Vuorinen (FIN)	Andres Gómez (SWE); Tor Forsse (SWE)
24 October 2009	Tournoi satellite, Copenhague	Satellite	Sten Priinits (EST)	Toni Kneist (GER)	David Bonde (DEN); Edoardo Munzone (ITA)
7 November 2009	Tournoi satellite, Oslo	Satellite	Claus Mørch (NOR)	Aivar Liimets (EST)	Fredrik Backer (NOR); Joaquim Videira (POR)
15 November 2009	Tournoi satellite, Aarhus	Satellite	Dirk Roeder (GER)	Carlo Rota (ITA)	Gerald Hinz (GER); Martin Jensen (DEN)
21 November 2009	Aphrodite Cup 2009, Nicosia	Satellite	Federico Filippa (ITA)	Ido Ajzenstadt (ISR)	Periklis Liatopoulos (GRE); Georges Ambalof (GRE)
28 November 2009	Tournoi satellite, Dublin	Satellite	João Cordeiro (POR)	Michele Bino (ITA)	Matteo Beretta (ITA); Giovanni Lippi (ITA)
10 January 2010	Coupe du Monde, Kish Island	World Cup	Jonathan Willis (GBR)	Ali Yaghoobian (IRI)	João Cordeiro (POR); Joaquim Videira (POR)
23 January 2010	Grand Prix du Qatar 2010, Doha	Grand Prix	Jörg Fiedler (GER)	Alexey Tikhomirov (RUS)	Sergey Khodos (RUS); Paolo Pizzo (ITA)
30 January 2010	Trophée Carroccio, Legnano	Grand Prix	Ulrich Robeiri (FRA)	Gauthier Grumier (FRA)	Paolo Pizzo (ITA); Jiří Beran (CZE)
6 February 2010	SAF Pokalen, Stockholm	Satellite	Tor Forsse (SWE)	Lorenzo Mancini (ITA)	Peter Lindholm (SWE); Mihails Jefremenko (LAT)
7 February 2010	Coupe du Monde Cidade de Lisboa, Lisbon	World Cup	Max Heinzer (SUI)	Hugues Boisvert-Simard (CAN)	José Luis Abajo (ESP); Sten Priinits (EST)
14 February 2010	Glaive de Tallinn, Tallinn	World Cup	Nikolai Novosjolov (EST)	Diego Confalonieri (ITA)	Alexey Tikhomirov (RUS); Igor Turchin (RUS)
28 February 2010	Grand Prix de Berne, Bern	Grand Prix	José Luis Abajo (ESP)	Yin Lianchi (CHN)	Enrico Garozzo (ITA); Rubén Limardo (VEN)
6 March 2010	Challenge Bernadotte Stockholm, Stockholm	Grand Prix	Jung Seung-hwa (KOR)	Jörg Fiedler (GER)	Géza Imre (HUN); Bohdan Nikishyn (UKR)
27 March 2010	Heidenheimer Pokal, Heidenheim	World Cup	Pavel Sukhov (RUS)	Bas Verwijlen (NED)	Gauthier Grumier (FRA); Gábor Boczkó (HUN)
8 May 2010	Challenge Monal, Paris	World Cup	Jörg Fiedler (GER)	Rubén Limardo (VEN)	José Luis Abajo (ESP); Matteo Tagliariol (ITA)
9 May 2010	Tournoi satellite, Istanbul	Satellite	Alexandros Kontogiannis (GRE)	Kiril Marinov (BUL)	Alin Sbarcia (ROU); Daniel Nica (ROU)
23 May 2010	St Duje s Cup, Split	Satellite	Edoardo Munzone (ITA)	Marin Dorian Pirvan (ROU)	Nicolas Dupin (FRA); Alin Mitrica (ROU)
23 May 2010	Challenge Australia, Sydney	World Cup	Weston Kelsey (USA)	Keisuke Sakamoto (JPN)	Joaquim Videira (POR); Tigran Bajgoric (CAN)
29 May 2010	Épée internationale, Montreal	World Cup	Kim Seung-gu (KOR)	Weston Kelsey (USA)	Hugues Boisvert-Simard (CAN); Jean-Michel Lucenay (FRA)
5 June 2010	Copa Mundial de Puerto Rico, Caguas	World Cup	Alfredo Rota (ITA)	Jung Seung-hwa (KOR)	Max Heinzer (SUI); Marc Font (ESP)
27 June 2010	Jockey Club Argentino, Buenos Aires	World Cup	Dmytro Karyuchenko (UKR)	Bas Verwijlen (NED)	Anatoliy Herey (UKR); Maksym Khvorost (UKR)

=== Women's épée ===
Color key

- Zone Championships
- Grand Prix
- World Cup
- Satellite

Date	Event	Type	Gold	Silver	Bronze
11 October 2009	51 Trophy of Belgrade, Belgrade	Satellite	Loredana Iordăchioiu (ROU)	Aleksandra Jevremovic (SRB)	Renata Knapik (POL); Romana Caran (SRB)
18 October 2009	Kupittaa tournament, Turku	Satellite	Catharina Kock (FIN)	Michaela Kock (FIN)	Nina Björkman (FIN); Sophie Haarlem (SWE)
25 October 2009	Tournoi satellite, Copenhague	Satellite	Nina Aabech (DEN)	Kinka Barvestad (SWE)	Suvi Lehtonen (FIN); Nathalie-Ullmann Ahl (DEN)
8 November 2009	Tournoi satellite, Oslo	Satellite	Kristina Kuusk (EST)	Emma Samuelsson (SWE)	Caroline Piasecka (NOR); Dagmar Baranikova (SVK)
15 November 2009	Tournoi satellite, Aarhus	Satellite	Nina Aabech (DEN)	Karin Louise Hooge (DEN)	Teresa Osland (NOR); Esther Pasch (GER)
21 November 2009	Aphrodite Cup 2009, Nicosia	Satellite	Miriam De Sepibus (SUI)	Kypriani Nicolaou (GRE)	Katia Kokkoti (GRE); Fani Varveri (GRE)
16 January 2010	Westend Cup, Budapest	Grand Prix	Maureen Nisima (FRA)	Monika Sozanska (GER)	Britta Heidemann (GER); Violetta Kolobova (RUS)
23 January 2010	Grand Prix, Doha	Grand Prix	Yana Shemyakina (UKR)	Emese Szász (HUN)	Bianca Del Carretto (ITA); Tatiana Logunova (RUS)
6 February 2010	Tournoi international, Rome	World Cup	Laura Flessel-Colovic (FRA)	Nathalie Moellhausen (ITA)	Imke Duplitzer (GER); Francesca Quondamcarlo (ITA)
7 February 2010	SAF Pokalen, Stockholm	Satellite	Catharina Kock (FIN)	Kinka Barvestad (SWE)	Larisa Andreeva (KGZ); Julia Zuikova (EST)
14 February 2010	Ciudad de Barcelona, Barcelona	World Cup	Britta Heidemann (GER)	Emma Samuelsson (SWE)	Mélanie Soiron (FRA); Ewa Nelip (POL)
20 February 2010	Challenge international de St-Maur, St-Maur	Grand Prix	Britta Heidemann (GER)	Oh Yun-hee (KOR)	Emese Szász (HUN); Laura Flessel-Colovic (FRA)
7 March 2010	Würth Cup, Tauberbischofsheim	World Cup	Emese Takács (HUN)	Tatiana Logunova (RUS)	Nathalie Alibert (FRA); Tímea Nagy (HUN)
14 March 2010	Coupe du Monde, Florina	World Cup	Ana Maria Brânză (ROU)	Sonja Tol (NED)	Anca Măroiu (ROU); Renata Knapik (POL)
21 March 2010	Épée de Moscow Region, Lobnya	World Cup	Tatiana Logunova (RUS)	Yana Shemyakina (UKR)	Anna Sivkova (RUS); Magdalena Piekarska (POL)
28 March 2010	Souvenir J. Nowara, Luxembourg	World Cup	Emese Szász (HUN)	Emma Samuelsson (SWE)	Marzia Muroni (ITA); Bianca Del Carretto (ITA)
9 May 2010	Tournoi satellite, Istanbul	Satellite	Loredana Iordăchioiu (ROU)	Reha Dogan (TUR)	Oana Puiu (ROU); Roxana Lazar (ROU)
15 May 2010	Tournoi international, Nankin	Grand Prix	Ana Maria Brânză (ROU)	Magdalena Piekarska (POL)	Sherraine Schalm (CAN); Yana Shemyakina (UKR)
23 May 2010	St Duje s Cup, Split	Satellite	Smiljka Rodić (SRB)	Raluca Cristina Sbîrcia (ROU)	Toncica Topic (CRO); Tihana Garib (CRO)
23 May 2010	Challenge Australia, Sydney	World Cup	Imke Duplitzer (GER)	Sonja Tol (NED)	Britta Heidemann (GER); Monika Sozanska (GER)
29 May 2010	Épée internationale, Montreal	Grand Prix	Tatiana Logunova (RUS)	Emese Szász (HUN)	Yin Mingfang (CHN); Francesca Boscarelli (ITA)
10 June 2010	Coupe du Monde, Havana	World Cup	Anca Măroiu (ROU)	Zuleidis Ortiz Fuente (CUB)	Ana Maria Brânză (ROU); Monika Sozanska (GER)
13 June 2010	Cole Cup, Newcastle	Satellite	Jessica Beer (NZL)	Elena Rainero (ITA)	Mary Cohen (GBR); Hannah Lawrence (GBR)

Men
1	Gauthier Grumier (FRA)	218
2	Jörg Fiedler (GER)	188
3	Nikolai Novosjolov (EST)	176
4	Jean-Michel Lucenay (FRA)	168
5	Paolo Pizzo (ITA)	158
6	Weston Kelsey (USA)	152
7	Jung Seung-hwa (KOR)	148
8	Gábor Boczkó (HUN)	148
9	Pavel Sukhov (RUS)	144
10	Max Heinzer (SUI)	138

Women
1	Emese Szász (HUN)	294
2	Tatiana Logunova (RUS)	250
3	Magdalena Piekarska (POL)	230
4	Britta Heidemann (GER)	220
5	Maureen Nisima (FRA)	210
6	Yana Shemyakina (UKR)	198
7	Imke Duplitzer (GER)	182
8	Oh Yun-hee (KOR)	180
9	Laura Flessel-Colovic (FRA)	178
10	Jung Hyo-jung (KOR)	170

== Individual Foil ==
=== Men's foil ===
Color key

- Zone Championships
- Grand Prix
- World Cup
- Satellite

Date	Event	Type	Gold	Silver	Bronze
18 October 2009	Leon Paul satellite fleuret masculin, London	Satellite	Sebastiaan Borst (NED)	Matteo Iaconis (ITA)	Filip Hedenskog (SWE); Lorenzo Pasini (ITA)
15 November 2009	Tournoi satellite fleuret masculin, Amsterdam	Satellite	Sebastiaan Borst (NED)	Matthijs Rohlfs (NED)	Federico Fico (ITA); Aljoscha Gollan (GER)
17 January 2010	Copenhagen Cup, Copenhagen	World Cup	Richard Kruse (GBR)	Radosław Glonek (POL)	Marcel Marcilloux (FRA); Julien Mertine (FRA)
30 January 2010	Challenge International de Paris, Paris	Grand Prix	Lei Sheng (CHN)	Kwon Young-ho (KOR)	Huang Liangcai (CHN); Aleksey Khovansky (RUS)
7 February 2010	Tournoi Ciudad de A Coruña, A Coruña	World Cup	Zhu Jun (CHN)	Jérémy Cadot (FRA)	Lei Sheng (CHN); Erwann Le Péchoux (FRA)
20 February 2010	Coupe Ville de Venise, Venise	Grand Prix	Lei Sheng (CHN)	Andrea Baldini (ITA)	Artem Sedov (RUS); Andrea Cassarà (ITA)
28 February 2010	Löwe von Bonn, Bonn	World Cup	Valerio Aspromonte (ITA)	Giorgio Avola (ITA)	Zhu Jun (CHN); Peter Joppich (GER)
14 March 2010	Coupe du Monde Cidade de Espinho, Espinho	World Cup	Renal Ganeyev (RUS)	Ruslan Nasibulin (RUS)	Artem Sedov (RUS); Marcin Zawada (POL)
21 March 2010	World Cup, Sharm El Sheikh	World Cup	Andrea Cassarà (ITA)	Stefano Barrera (ITA)	Simone Vanni (ITA); Valerio Aspromonte (ITA)
27 March 2010	Tournoi satellite fleuret masculin, Copenhague	Satellite	Mats Stijlaart (NED)	Gael Santos (POR)	Oleg Drobyshev (RUS); Alexander Tsoronis (DEN)
1 May 2010	Coupe du Monde, Shanghai	Grand Prix	Andrea Cassarà (ITA)	Peter Joppich (GER)	Valerio Aspromonte (ITA); Luca Simoncelli (ITA)
10 May 2010	SK Trophée Séoul, Seoul	World Cup	Kwon Young-ho (KOR)	Richard Kruse (GBR)	Park Hee-kyung (KOR); Ha Tae-kyu (KOR)
15 May 2010	Prince Takamado WC, Tokyo	Grand Prix	Yuki Ota (JPN)	Valerio Aspromonte (ITA)	Laurence Halsted (GBR); Benjamin Kleibrink (GER)
25 May 2010	Fleuret de St-Petersbourg, Saint Petersburg	Grand Prix	Lei Sheng (CHN)	Richard Kruse (GBR)	Miles Chamley-Watson (USA); Choi Byung-chul (KOR)
30 May 2010	Épée internationale, Montreal	World Cup	Ha Tae-kyu (KOR)	René Pranz (AUT)	Choi Byung-chul (KOR); Alexander Massialas (USA)
4 June 2010	Copa Villa La Habana, Havana	World Cup	Andrea Cassarà (ITA)	Victor Sintès (FRA)	Stefano Barrera (ITA); Giorgio Avola (ITA)
12 June 2010	Copa del Mundo, Isla de Margarita	World Cup	Bojan Jovanović (CRO)	Miles Chamley-Watson (USA)	Rafael Suárez (USA); David Willette (USA)

=== Women's foil ===
Color key

- Zone Championships
- Grand Prix
- World Cup
- Satellite

Date	Event	Type	Gold	Silver	Bronze
7 February 2010	Star Cup Belgrade, Belgrade	World Cup	Larisa Korobeynikova (RUS)	Corinne Maîtrejean (FRA)	Yuliya Biryukova (RUS); Yana Ruzavina (RUS)
14 February 2010	Coupe du Monde, Salzburg	World Cup	Valentina Vezzali (ITA)	Sylwia Gruchała (POL)	Elisa Di Francisca (ITA); Arianna Errigo (ITA)
21 February 2010	Cup der Sparkasse Leipzig, Leipzig	World Cup	Aida Shanayeva (RUS)	Nam Hyun-hee (KOR)	Kamilla Gafurzianova (RUS); Shi Yun (CHN)
27 February 2010	The Artus Court PKO BP, Gdańsk	Grand Prix	Valentina Vezzali (ITA)	Arianna Errigo (ITA)	Elisa Di Francisca (ITA); Nam Hyun-hee (KOR)
6 March 2010	Coupe du Monde, Turin	Grand Prix	Valentina Vezzali (ITA)	Nam Hyun-hee (KOR)	Elisa Di Francisca (ITA); Benedetta Durando (ITA)
14 March 2010	Cup Eximbank, Budapest	World Cup	Jeon Hee-sook (KOR)	Evgenia Lamonova (RUS)	Claudia Pigliapoco (ITA); Viktoria Nikichina (RUS)
20 March 2010	World Cup, Sharm El Sheikh	World Cup	Valentina Vezzali (ITA)	Elisa Di Francisca (ITA)	Giovanna Trillini (ITA); Ilaria Salvatori (ITA)
27 March 2010	Challenge Jeanty, Marseille	Grand Prix	Elisa Di Francisca (ITA)	Nam Hyun-hee (KOR)	Sylwia Gruchała (POL); Valentina Vezzali (ITA)
28 March 2010	Tournoi satellite fleuret féminin, Copenhague	Satellite	Marta Cammilletti (ITA)	Michala Cellerová (SVK)	Sophie Troiano (GBR); Diana Yakovleva (RUS)
4 May 2010	Coupe du Monde, Shanghai	World Cup	Valentina Vezzali (ITA)	Elisa Di Francisca (ITA)	Arianna Errigo (ITA); Nam Hyun-hee (KOR)
8 May 2010	SK Trophée Séoul, Seoul	Grand Prix	Valentina Vezzali (ITA)	Virginie Ujlaky (FRA)	Ilaria Salvatori (ITA); Corinne Maîtrejean (FRA)
22 May 2010	Fleuret de St-Petersbourg, Saint Petersburg	Grand Prix	Valentina Vezzali (ITA)	Nam Hyun-hee (KOR)	Lee Hye-sun (KOR); Aida Mohamed (HUN)
8 June 2010	Tournoi Nancy Uranga, Havana	World Cup	Valentina Vezzali (ITA)	Arianna Errigo (ITA)	Sylwia Gruchała (POL); Margherita Granbassi (ITA)
20 June 2010	Coupe du Monde, New York	World Cup	Nam Hyun-hee (KOR)	Astrid Guyart (FRA)	Sylwia Gruchała (POL); Corinne Maîtrejean (FRA)

Men
1	Lei Sheng (CHN)	358
2	Yuki Ota (JPN)	246
3	Andrea Cassarà (FRA)	232
4	Peter Joppich (ITA)	228
5	Miles Chamley-Watson (USA)	220
6	Valerio Aspromonte (ITA)	218
7	Andrea Baldini (ITA)	198
8	Richard Kruse (GBR)	186
9	Huang Liangcai (CHN)	178
10	Gerek Meinhardt (USA)	164

Women
1	Valentina Vezzali (ITA)	444
2	Nam Hyun-hee (KOR)	348
3	Elisa Di Francisca (ITA)	348
4	Arianna Errigo (ITA)	280
5	Jeon Hee-sook (KOR)	208
6	Corinne Maîtrejean (FRA)	208
7	Sylwia Gruchała (POL)	198
8	Aida Shanayeva (RUS)	172
9	Yevgeniya Lamonova (RUS)	160
10	Ilaria Salvatori (ITA)	158

== Individual Sabre ==
Men
1	Nicolas Limbach (GER)	290
2	Oh Eun-seok (KOR)	230
3	Gu Bon-gil (KOR)	226
4	Áron Szilágyi (HUN)	208
5	Veniamin Reshetnikov (RUS)	186
6	Luigi Tarantino (ITA)	174
7	Rareș Dumitrescu (ROU)	172
8	Aleksey Yakimenko (RUS)	170
9	Luigi Samele (ITA)	170
10	Won Woo-young (KOR)	160

Women
1	Mariel Zagunis (USA)	444
2	Olha Kharlan (UKR)	380
3	Sofiya Velikaya (RUS)	284
4	Yekaterina Dyachenko (RUS)	202
5	Aleksandra Socha (POL)	198
6	Yuliya Gavrilova (RUS)	182
7	Ilaria Bianco (ITA)	180
8	Irene Vecchi (ITA)	174
9	Stefanie Kubissa (GER)	162
10	Zhu Min (CHN)	162

== Team Épée ==
Men
1	Hungary	300
2	France	279
3	South Korea	214
4	Poland	214
5	United States	204
6	China	203
7	Ukraine	190
8	Italy	189
9	Russia	176
10	Germany	174

Women
1	Romania	344
2	Poland	324
3	Germany	304
4	China	271
5	France	258
6	Italy	256
7	Russia	253
8	South Korea	248
9	Hungary	194
10	United States	184

== Team Foil ==
Men
1	China	424
2	Italy	372
3	Russia	310
4	Japan	275
5	France	245
6	South Korea	228
7	United States	219
8	Germany	212
9	Poland	208
10	Great Britain	198

Women
1	Italy	384
2	South Korea	276
3	Russia	256
4	Poland	254
5	Germany	222
6	United States	195
7	China	192
8	France	185
9	Japan	178
10	Hungary	172

== Team Sabre ==
Men
1	Italy	336
2	Romania	286
3	Russia	274
4	South Korea	238
5	France	216
6	China	215
7	Germany	201
8	Ukraine	197
9	United States	194
10	Hungary	183

Women
1	Russia	436
2	Ukraine	348
3	United States	316
4	France	286
5	China	254
6	Poland	234
7	Italy	220
8	South Korea	205
9	Hungary	194
10	Kazakhstan	161
