= Men's épée at the 2010 World Fencing Championships =

- Venue: Grand Palais
- Location: Paris, France
- Dates: 8 November

Medalists
gold medal	Nikolai Novosjolov	Estonia
silver medal	Gauthier Grumier	France
bronze medal	Jean-Michel Lucenay	France
bronze medal	Gábor Boczkó	Hungary

The Men's épée event took place on November 8, 2010 at Grand Palais.

== Draw ==
=== Finals ===
Semi-finals
(Estonia) Nikolai Novosjolov	15
(Hungary) Gábor Boczkó	11
(France) Gauthier Grumier	15
(France) Jean-Michel Lucenay	12

Final
(Estonia) Nikolai Novosjolov	15
(France) Gauthier Grumier	8

=== Top half ===
==== Section 1 ====
Round of 64
(Germany) Jörg Fiedler	15
(Turkey) Yusuf Bojte	13
(Estonia) Nikolai Novosjolov	15
(Switzerland) Fabian Kauter	11
(Spain) Mario Alvarado	15
(Bulgaria) Deyan Dobrev	12
(Germany) Sven Schmid	9
(Italy) Alfredo Rota	13
(Switzerland) Max Heinzer	15
(Finland) Alexander Lahtinen	7
(Canada) Vincent Pelletier	14
(South Korea) Kim Won-jin	15
(United Kingdom) Nicholas Perry	9
(Italy) Enrico Garozzo	15
(Lithuania) Tomas Krasikovas	15
(France) Jérôme Jeannet	14

Round of 32
(Germany) Jörg Fiedler	12
(Estonia) Nikolai Novosjolov	13
(Spain) Mario Alvarado	15
(Italy) Alfredo Rota	13
(Switzerland) Max Heinzer	12
(South Korea) Kim Won-jin	15
(Italy) Enrico Garozzo	15
(Lithuania) Tomas Krasikovas	6

Round of 16
(Estonia) Nikolai Novosjolov	15
(Spain) Mario Alvarado	12
(South Korea) Kim Won-jin	11
(Italy) Enrico Garozzo	15

Quarterfinals
(Estonia) Nikolai Novosjolov	15
(Italy) Enrico Garozzo	14

==== Section 2 ====
Round of 64
(Italy) Paolo Pizzo	15
(Romania) Bertalan Arkosi	6
(United States) Benjamin Bratton	10
(China) Huang Chao	9
(Hungary) Gábor Boczkó	15
(Poland) Krzysztof Mikołajczak	13
(Poland) Robert Andrzejuk	15
(Canada) Hugues Boisvert-Simard	2
(Venezuela) Silvio Fernández	9
(Russia) Pavel Sukhov	15
(Cuba) Guillermo Madrigal	13
(Ukraine) Maksym Khvorost	12
(Hungary) Géza Imre	12
(Latvia) Mihails Jefremenko	15
(Colombia) Javier Suárez	8
(Italy) Matteo Tagliariol	15

Round of 32
(Italy) Paolo Pizzo	11
(United States) Benjamin Bratton	15
(Hungary) Gábor Boczkó	15
(Poland) Robert Andrzejuk	4
(Russia) Pavel Sukhov	15
(Cuba) Guillermo Madrigal	7
(Latvia) Mihails Jefremenko	9
(Italy) Matteo Tagliariol	15

Round of 16
(United States) Benjamin Bratton	8
(Hungary) Gábor Boczkó	15
(Russia) Pavel Sukhov	15
(Italy) Matteo Tagliariol	12

Quarterfinals
(Hungary) Gábor Boczkó	15
(Russia) Pavel Sukhov	10

=== Bottom half ===
==== Section 3 ====
Round of 64
(South Korea) Jung Seung-hwa	15
(Israel) Doron Levit	13
(Romania) Adrian Pop	13
(Poland) Radosław Zawrotniak	15
(South Korea) Park Kyoung-doo	4
(United States) Seth Kelsey	5
(Ukraine) Bohdan Nikishyn	9
(Russia) Anton Avdeev	10
(France) Ulrich Robeiri	12
(China) Li Guojie	15
(Latvia) Jurijs Sjanita	15
(Spain) Marc Font	14
(Chile) Paris Inostroza	15
(Argentina) José Félix Domínguez	10
(Uzbekistan) Ruslan Kudayev	9
(France) Gauthier Grumier	15

Round of 32
(South Korea) Jung Seung-hwa	5
(Poland) Radosław Zawrotniak	15
(United States) Seth Kelsey	15
(Russia) Anton Avdeev	11
(China) Li Guojie	15
(Latvia) Jurijs Sjanita	14
(Chile) Paris Inostroza	7
(France) Gauthier Grumier	15

Round of 16
(Poland) Radosław Zawrotniak	9
(United States) Seth Kelsey	15
(China) Li Guojie	9
(France) Gauthier Grumier	15

Quarterfinals
(United States) Seth Kelsey	9
(France) Gauthier Grumier	15

==== Section 4 ====
Round of 64
(Venezuela) Rubén Limardo	13
(United States) Benjamin Ungar	15
(Austria) Jörg Mathe	13
(France) Jean-Michel Lucenay	15
(Kazakhstan) Elmir Alimzhanov	15
(South Korea) Jung Jin-sun	11
(Czech Republic) Jiří Beran	15
(Portugal) Joaquim Videira	9
(Netherlands) Bas Verwijlen	15
(Canada) Igor Gantsevich	12
(Senegal) Alexandre Bouzaid	12
(Ukraine) Dmytro Karyuchenko	15
(Germany) Martin Schmitt	15
(Brazil) Ivan Baumgartner	11
(Germany) Christoph Kneip	14
(Spain) José Luis Abajo	15

Round of 32
(United States) Benjamin Ungar	12
(France) Jean-Michel Lucenay	15
(Kazakhstan) Elmir Alimzhanov	15
(Czech Republic) Jiří Beran	10
(Netherlands) Bas Verwijlen	15
(Ukraine) Dmytro Karyuchenko	14
(Germany) Martin Schmitt	15
(Spain) José Luis Abajo	8

Round of 16
(France) Jean-Michel Lucenay	15
(Kazakhstan) Elmir Alimzhanov	8
(Netherlands) Bas Verwijlen	10
(Germany) Martin Schmitt	15

Quarterfinals
(France) Jean-Michel Lucenay	15
(Germany) Martin Schmitt	14
