= Seamus Robinson =

Seamus Robinson may refer to:

- Seamus Robinson (fencer) (born 1975), Australian fencer
- Séumas Robinson (Irish republican) (1890–1961), Irish rebel and politician
