= Soren Thompson =

American fencer (born 1981)

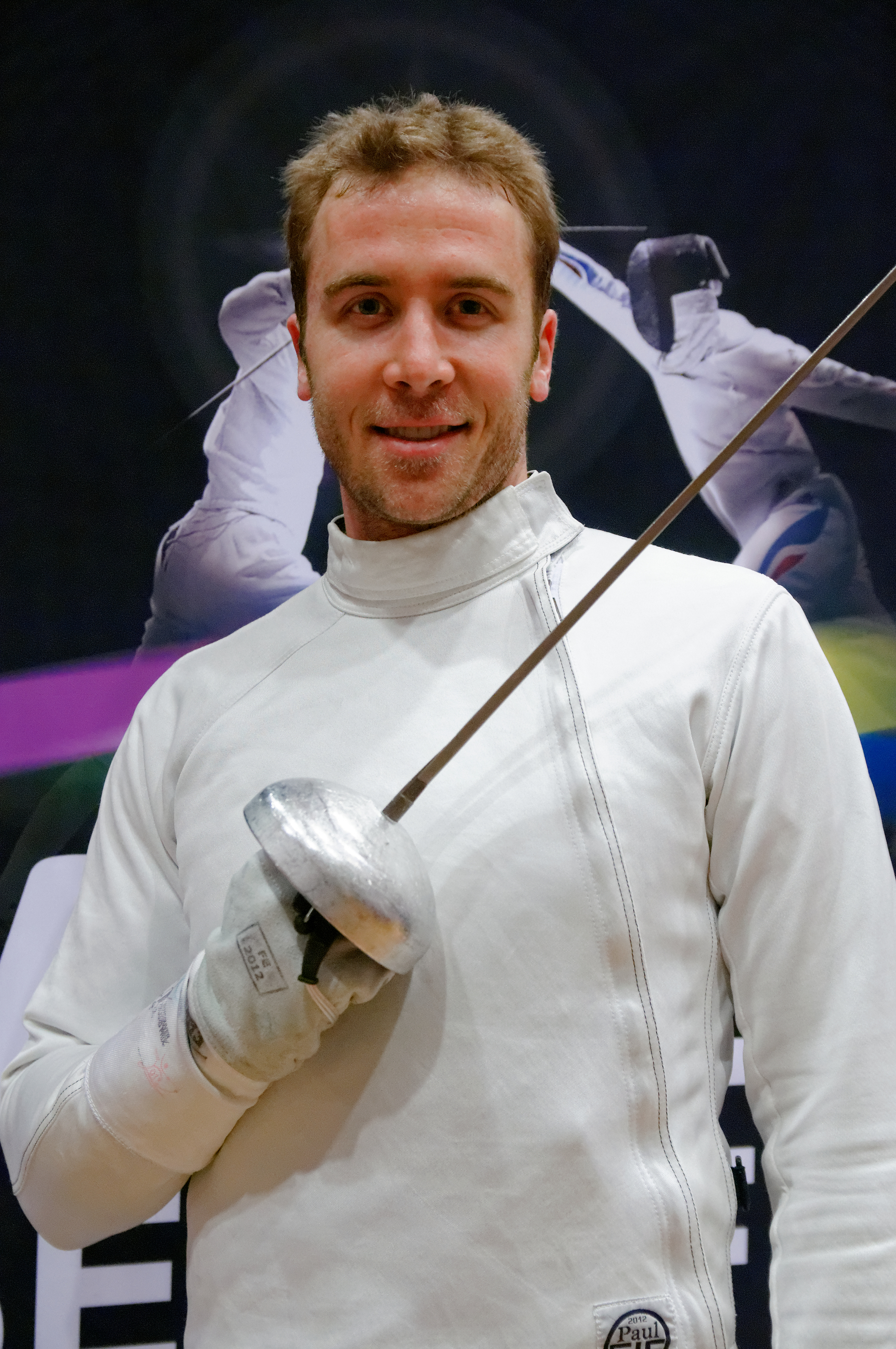
- Thompson at the Trophée Monal in 2013

Personal information
- Born: May 5, 1981 (age 45) San Diego, California, U.S.
- Home town: New York City
- Height: 1.91 m (6 ft 3 in)
- Weight: 88 kg (194 lb)

Fencing career
- Sport: Fencing
- Country: United States
- Weapon: épée
- Hand: Right-handed
- Club: New York Athletic Club
- Head coach: Self and Sebastien Dos Santos
- FIE ranking: current ranking
Medal record
Men's fencing
Representing United States
World Championships
Gold medal – first place	2012 Kyiv	Team épée
Bronze medal – third place	1999 Keszthely	Junior Team épée
Maccabiah Games
Silver medal – second place	2005 Tel Aviv	Individual Épée
Representing Princeton University
NCAA Fencing Championships
Gold medal – first place	2001	Individual Épée
Silver medal – second place	2002	Individual Épée
Bronze medal – third place	2005	Individual Épée

Soren Hunter Miles S Thompson (born May 5, 1981) is an American épée fencer, team world champion, and two-time Olympian. He represented the United States in the 2004 Olympics in Athens, Greece, where he reached the quarterfinals and came in 7th, the best US result in the event since 1956 and at the time the second-best US result of all time. He also represented the US in the 2012 Olympics in London. Thompson won a gold medal and world championship in the team épée event at the 2012 World Fencing Championships. He was inducted into the USA Fencing Hall of Fame in 2018, and the Southern California Jewish Sports Hall of Fame in 2020.

== Early and personal life ==
Thompson was born in San Diego, California, and attended Torrey Pines High School, graduating in 1999. He then attended Princeton University, majoring in Art and Architecture. While attending Princeton, Thompson took a year off from school to focus on his training prior to the 2004 Athens Olympics. Thompson graduated with an A.B. in art and archaeology from Princeton University in 2005 after completing an 87-page-long senior thesis, titled "The San Diego School of Organic Architecture", under the supervision of Esther da Costa Meyer.

From 2008 until April 2011 he worked for Hycrete, a clean-tech company in Northern New Jersey. Since 2015, Thompson has served as Vice President of Business Development of Daxor Corporation, a blood volume diagnostic company in New York City. He received an M.B.A. from Columbia Business School in 2016.

He was a resident of San Diego, and now resides in New York City.

== Fencing career ==
Thompson started fencing when he was 7 years old. He eventually became the highest-ranked junior in the United States.

Thompson currently represents the New York Athletic Club, and trains there and at the Olympic Training Center in Colorado Springs. His coaches have included Alison Reid, Lisa Posthumus, Gago Demirchian, Yefim Litvan, Michel Sebastiani, Heizaburo Okawa, and Michael D'Asaro Sr.

=== NCAA championships ===
Thompson attended Princeton University. Fencing at Princeton under Maître Michel Sebastiani, Thompson was the 2001 National Collegiate Athletic Association (NCAA) Épée Champion, came in 2nd in 2002, and was 3rd in 2005.

His other NCAA awards include First Team All-American in 2001–02 and 2005, and Honorary All-American in 2003, First Team All-Ivy in 2001–03 and 2005, and Academic All-Ivy in 2005.

In 2005, Princeton awarded Thompson the William Winston Roper Trophy, its highest honor for a male athlete.

=== Junior and Senior National Championships ===
Thompson won the US Junior National Championship and the US Junior Olympics Championship in 1999 in épée.

He won individual gold medals in men's épée at both the 2011 US Fencing National Championships and the 2018 US Fencing National Championships.

Through 2021, he has won team gold medals in men's épée in the 2003, 2004, 2006, 2007, 2010, 2011, 2016, 2019, and 2021 US Fencing National Championships with teams from the New York Athletic Club.

=== World Championships ===
Thompson won the team bronze medal in the 1999 Junior World Fencing Championships. The following year, he came in 11th individually at the 2000 Junior World Fencing Championships.

Thompson took 8th in the 2003 World Fencing Championships in Havana, Cuba, defeating top seed Ivan Kovacs of Hungary (15–14).

He came in 26th in the 2006 World Fencing Championships in épée, in Turin, Italy. At the 2011 World Fencing Championships, Thompson made it as far as the Round of 16 (where he lost to 2011 world champion Paolo Pizzo of Italy) in Catania, Italy.

At the 2012 World Fencing Championships in Kyiv, Ukraine, in April 2012, Thompson won the gold medal for the team épée event, as part of the U.S. Men's Épée Team that won the first Senior World Championship fencing title for American men in history. The US team defeated six-time reigning World Champion France in the finals.

=== Olympics ===
==== 2004 ====
While attending Princeton, Thompson took a year off of school to focus on his training prior to the 2004 Athens Olympics. He qualified for both the individual and team épée competitions in Athens.

Thompson fenced for the US in the 2004 Olympics at 23 years of age, taking 7th place in the individual épée competition, the best US result in the event since 1956 and at the time the second-best of all time. He defeated Paris Inostroza of Chile in Round Two, 13–12. In the Round of 16, he defeated Alfredo Rota of Italy, the No. 1 ranked épée fencer in the world and 2000 Olympics team épée gold medal winner, 15–13. He then lost 15–11 to the 2000 Olympic gold medalist Pavel Kolobkov of Russia, who went on to win the 2004 Olympic silver medal. Thompson became the first American to reach the men's épée quarterfinals in nearly 50 years.

He also took 5th place with the US épée squad in the team competition at the 2004 Olympics.

The US Olympic Committee named him the 2004 Male Athlete of the Year: Fencing.

Thompson sought to qualify for the 2008 Beijing Olympics, and was having the best season of his career. He suffered a serious injury, however, a fully torn off-the-bone right hamstring, before he was able to qualify. He therefore retired – temporarily, it turned out – from competitive fencing.

==== 2012 ====
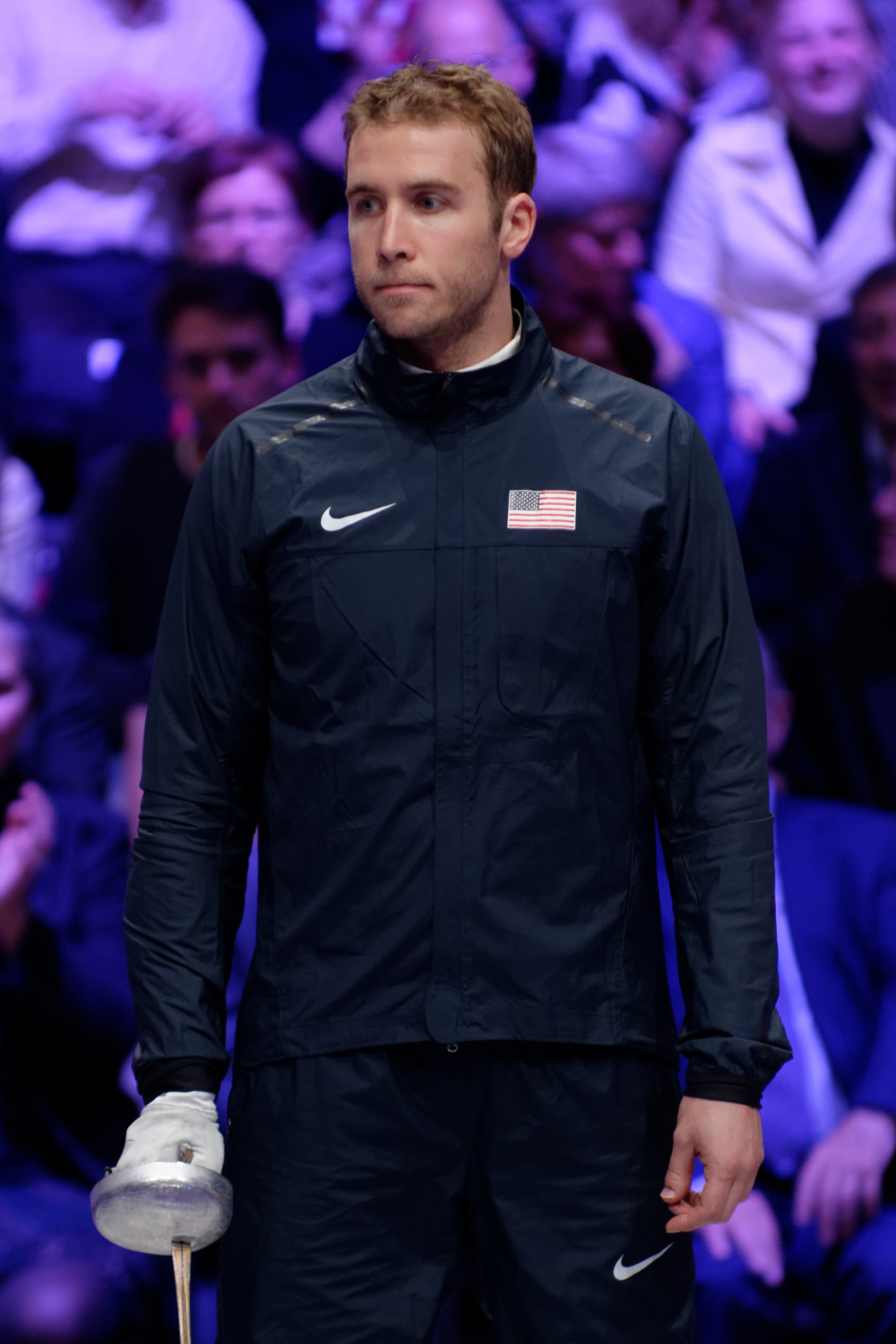
Soren Thompson in 2013

Thompson came out of retirement in 2010, and trained before and after his full-time job. He left his job in April 2011 to focus exclusively on fencing. He decided to not have a coach, as he didn't find what he wanted in a coach in New York City, and knew what he wanted to do, and felt he just needed to execute."

He qualified and represented the United States in the 2012 London Olympics. Thompson was eliminated in the round of 32 in the individual épée competition by Jörg Fiedler of Germany, the reigning European champion, finishing in 19th place. No team men's épée event was held at the 2012 Olympics.

Thompson finished the 2012 season ranked 7th in the world in individual épée.

=== Pan American Games and Pan American Championships ===
Thompson competed on the U.S. men's épée team and was a substitute on the U.S. men's foil team at the 2003 Pan American Games in Santo Domingo, Dominican Republic. The épée team finished fourth, while the foil team won a gold medal. He subsequently won a team gold medal at the 2011 Pan American Games in Guadalajara, Mexico.

He won individual and team gold medals at both the 2011 Pan American Fencing Championships in Reno, Nevada, and the 2012 Pan American Fencing Championships in Cancún, Mexico. Thompson then won a team silver medal at the 2013 Pan American Championships.

=== Maccabiah Games ===
Thompson, who is Jewish, won a team silver medal at the 2005 17th Maccabiah Games in Israel.

=== Senior North American Cup ===
He is a senior North American Cup (NAC) champion. In 2010, Thompson won a bronze medal at the North American Cup A. In 2012, he won a silver medal at the December North American Cup.

=== World Cup ===
Thompson came in 2nd, winning the silver medal, at the 2004 Buenos Aires Senior Épée World Cup. He won a team silver medal at the 2012 Legnano World Cup, and a team bronze medal at the 2012 Tallinn World Cup. The following year he again won a team silver medal at the 2013 Legnano World Cup.

== Halls of Fame ==
Thompson was inducted into the USA Fencing Hall of Fame in 2018.

He is a 2020 Southern California Jewish Sports Hall of Fame inductee.

== Miscellaneous ==
Thompson appears in Impractical Jokers an American hidden camera-practical joke reality series, as a guest star.

Thompson was listed at # 61 in the book 100 of the Best Fencers of All Time (A&V, 2014).

== See also ==
- Princeton University Olympians
- List of select Jewish fencers
- List of NCAA fencing champions
- List of USFA Division I National Champions
- List of USFA Hall of Fame members
