= Alexandru Nyisztor =

Romanian fencer (born 1979)

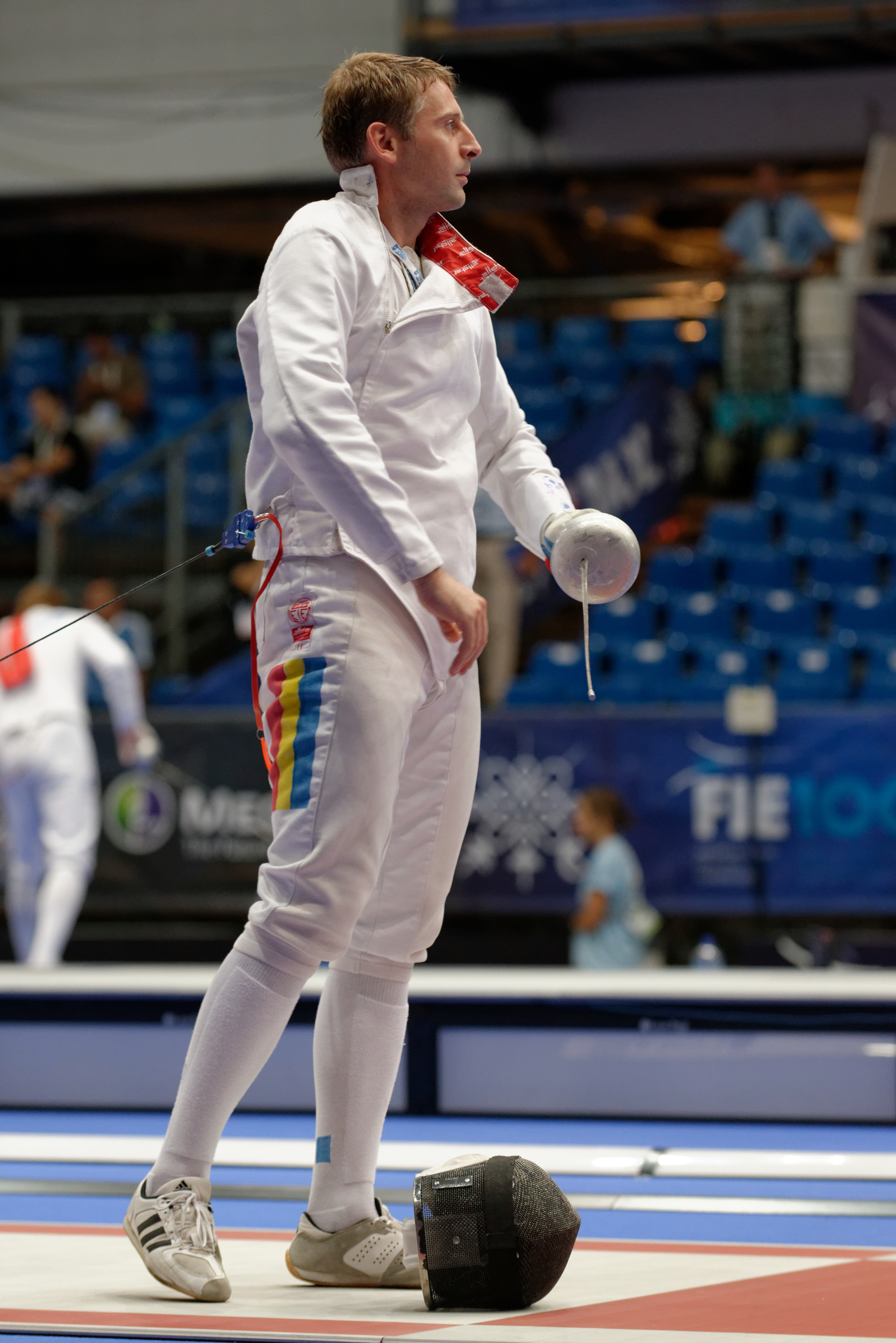
- At the 2013 World Fencing Championships

Personal information
- Full name: Alexandru Nyisztor-Csáki
- Born: 27 June 1979 (age 47) Satu Mare, Romania
- Height: 1.80 m (5 ft 11 in)
- Weight: 73 kg (161 lb)

Fencing career
- Sport: Fencing
- Country: Romania
- Weapon: Épée
- Hand: left-handed
- Club: CSU Târgu Mureș
- FIE ranking: current ranking

Alexandru Nyisztor (born 27 June 1979) is a Romanian épée fencer, who competed in the 2004 Summer Olympics. He is eight-time national épée champion of Romania.

== Career ==
Nyisztor took up fencing when he was nine years old, on medical advice: he was a sickly child and his doctor recommended his mother to take him to sport. His mother chose fencing because the hall was close to home. He grew bored quickly and started to play truant until his mother met his coach, Marcela Moldovan, who revealed he had not trained for a while. Nyisztor was summoned to give in his equipment. When he arrived to the hall, he thought he would train one last time and eventually decided to go on. He practiced foil first, then turned to épée as well.

He transferred to CS Crișul Oradea in 1993 to follow his coach, while continuing his studies at his home city, Satu Mare. He began to train in épée under the coaching of Nicolae Ille. In 1994, he was asked to join both the national foil team in Satu Mare and the national épée team in Craiova. He opted for the latter. He earned a bronze medal at the 1996 Cadet World Championships in Tournai and at the 1999 Junior World Championships in Tournai.

In the senior category, Nyisztor posted a quarter-finals finish at the 2001 European Championships in Koblenz after he lost to Russia's Pavel Kolobkov, then another at the 2002 edition, losing this time to Hungary's Gábor Boczkó. Nyisztor climbed his first World Cup podium with a bronze medal at the 2003 Bratislava Grand Prix, but he could not attend the 2003 World Championships because the Romanian Fencing Federation was late for registration. He, however, qualified to the individual event at the 2004 Summer Olympics through the European zone qualifier in Ghent, becoming the first male épée fencer to represent Romania at Olympic Games. For his Olympic début, he defeated Ukraine's Bohdan Nikishyn in the preliminary round, but lost to Italy's Alfredo Rota in the table of 32.

Nyisztor posted another last-8 finish at the 2005 European Championships in Zalaegerszeg, after losing to Olympic champion Marcel Fischer. He reached the quarter-finals too at the 2006 World Championships in Turin, defeating the Netherlands' Bas Verwijlen and Ukraine's Maksym Khvorost along the way. He was defeated 12–15 by eventual World champion Lei Wang of China.

This career high was followed by dry years: he did not reach the final table of 64 at the 2007 World Championships in St Petersburg and failed to qualify to the 2008 Summer Olympics. He took coaching duties for the junior team at CSM Oradea and as assistant coach to Nicolae Ille. In 2010, he left his club amid controversy that resulted from his behaviour at the Romanian national championship, where CSM Oradea lost their team title. He transferred afterwards to CSU Târgu Mureș.

In 2011, Nyisztor won the St Duje's Cup satellite tournament in Split, Croatia. He took part in the 2011 World Championships in Catania, but lost in the first round to Norway's Sturla Torkildsen. He also suffered an early exit at the 2013 edition in Budapest, this time at the hands of World No.1 Max Heinzer of Switzerland.
