= Fabian Kauter =

Swiss fencer (born 1985)

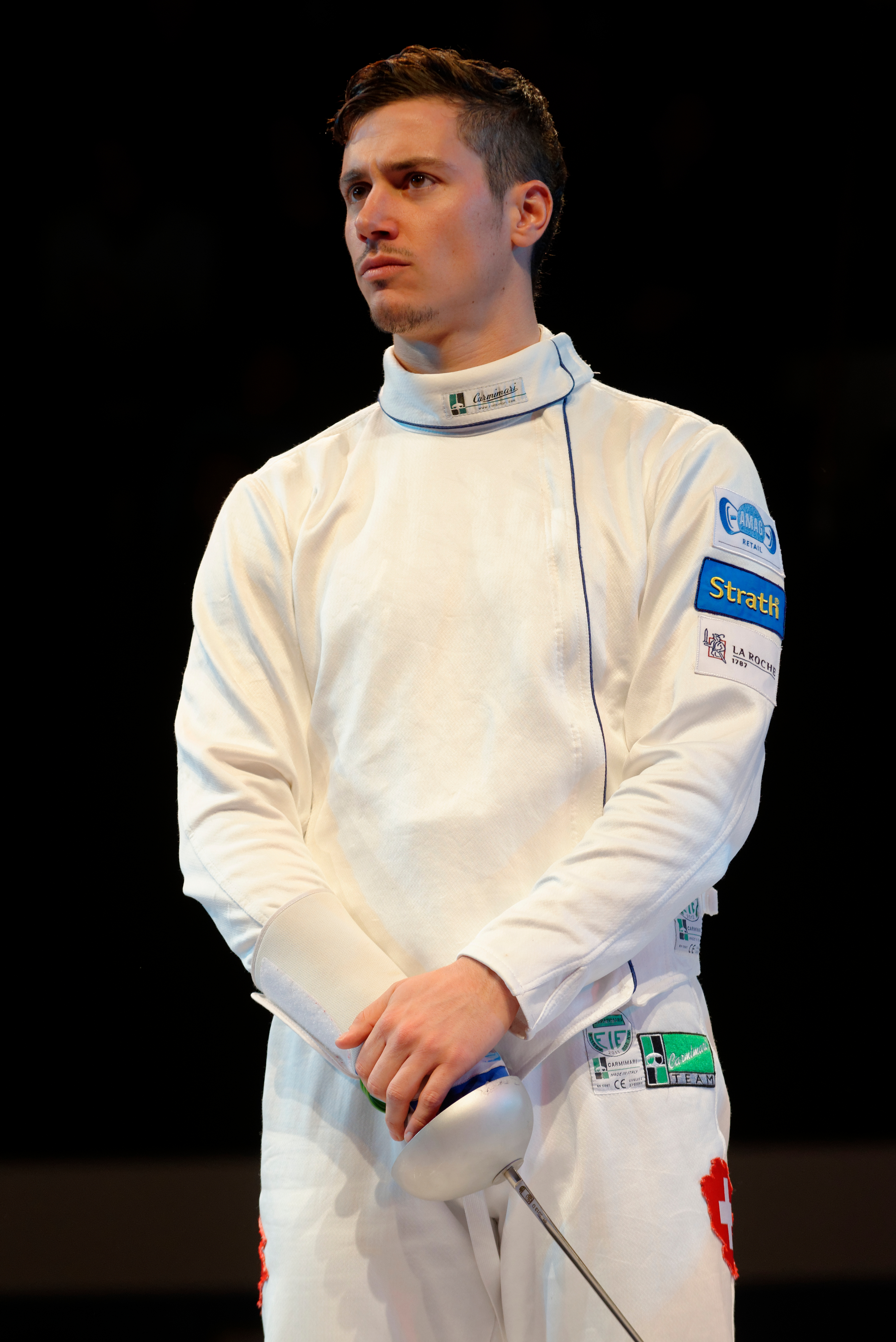
- Kauter at the 2013 Masters Épée

Personal information
- Nicknames: YuRi, Fabu
- Nationality: Swiss
- Born: 22 September 1985 (age 41) Bern, Switzerland
- Home town: Bern, Switzerland
- Height: 1.81 m (5 ft 11 1/2 in)
- Weight: 80 kg (176 lb; 12 st 8 lb)

Fencing career
- Sport: Fencing
- Weapon: épée
- Hand: Right-handed
- National coach: Angelo Mazzoni, Gianni Muzio
- Club: Fechtclub Bern
- Head coach: Christian Kauter
- FIE ranking: current ranking
Medal record
World Championships
Bronze medal – third place	2011 Catania	Individual
Bronze medal – third place	2011 Catania	Team
Bronze medal – third place	2013 Budapest	Individual
Bronze medal – third place	2014 Kazan	Team
Bronze medal – third place	2015 Moscow	Team
European Championships
Gold medal – first place	2004 Copenhagen	Team
Gold medal – first place	2012 Legnano	Team
Gold medal – first place	2013 Zagreb	Team
Gold medal – first place	2014 Strasbourg	Team
Silver medal – second place	2009 Plovdiv	Individual
Bronze medal – third place	2007 Ghent	Individual

Fabian Kauter (born 22 September 1985) is a Swiss right-handed épée fencer and two-time Olympian.

Kauter competed in the 2012 London Olympic Games and the 2016 Rio de Janeiro Olympic Games.

Kauter won a bronze medal in the individual men's épée event and a bronze medal in the team men's épée event at the 2011 World Fencing Championships in Catania, Italy, a bronze medal in the individual men's épée event at the 2013 World Fencing Championships in Budapest, Hungary, a bronze medal in the team men's épée event at the 2014 World Fencing Championships in Kazan, Russia, and a bronze medal in the team men's épée event at the 2015 World Fencing Championships in Moscow, Russia.

Kauter won a bronze medal in the individual men's épée event at the 2007 European Fencing Championships in Ghent, Belgium.

Between 2011 and 2015, Kauter won two FIE Men's Épée Grand Prix titles, in addition to a silver medal and two bronze medals.

Between 2011 and 2014, Kauter won a FIE Men's Épée World Cup title, in addition to two silver medals and three bronze medals.

== Personal life ==
Kauter's first sport was football, but a series of injuries lead him to turn to another sport. He took up fencing at age ten. His father, Christian Kauter, is a two-time Olympic medalist, and his brother, Michael Kauter, is a former Olympic fencer, both in épée.

Kauter also pursues a musical career under the artist name YuRi. He released in 2009 his first album Summer in Sibirie, followed in 2012 by Kopf über Wasser. In 2013, he co-founded "I believe in you", a crowdfunding platform for sport projects in Switzerland.

== Medal Record ==
=== World Championship ===
Year	Location	Event	Position
2011	Catania, Italy	Team Men's Épée	3rd
2011	Catania, Italy	Individual Men's Épée	3rd
2013	Budapest, Hungary	Individual Men's Épée	3rd
2014	Kazan, Russia	Team Men's Épée	3rd
2015	Moscow, Russia	Team Men's Épée	3rd

=== European Championship ===
Year	Location	Event	Position
2007	Ghent, Belgium	Individual Men's Épée	3rd

=== Grand Prix ===
Date	Location	Event	Position
02/11/2011	Doha, Qatar	Individual Men's Épée	3rd
05/14/2011	Stockholm, Sweden	Individual Men's Épée	1st
05/11/2013	Bern, Switzerland	Individual Men's Épée	3rd
03/22/2014	Vancouver, Canada	Individual Men's Épée	1st
12/04/2015	Doha, Qatar	Individual Men's Épée	2nd

=== World Cup ===
Date	Location	Event	Position
06/17/2011	Buenos Aires, Argentina	Individual Men's Épée	3rd
03/16/2012	Paris, France	Individual Men's Épée	2nd
04/27/2012	Heidenheim, Germany	Individual Men's Épée	2nd
06/29/2012	Buenos Aires, Argentina	Individual Men's Épée	1st
03/15/2013	Tallinn, Estonia	Individual Men's Épée	3rd
11/14/2014	Tallinn, Estonia	Individual Men's Épée	3rd
