= Marcel Fischer =

Swiss fencer

Personal information
- Born: 14 August 1978 (age 48) Biel/Bienne, Switzerland

Sport
- Sport: Fencing
Medal record
Men's fencing
Representing Switzerland
Olympic Games
Gold medal – first place	2004 Athens	Individual épée
Summer Universiade
Bronze medal – third place	1999 Palma de Mallorca	Individual épée
Bronze medal – third place	2001 Beijing	Individual épée
Bronze medal – third place	2005 Izmir	Individual épée

Marcel Fischer (born 14 August 1978) is a Swiss fencer who competed in the Men's Épée Individual at the 2004 Summer Olympics and won the gold medal. He finished 4th at the 2000 Olympics.

His achievements earned him the 2004 Swiss Award in sports.
