= Abderrahmane Daidj =

Algerian fencer (born 1975)

Personal information
- Born: 19 October 1975 (age 50)

Sport
- Sport: Fencing

Abderrahmane Daidj (born 19 October 1975) is an Algerian fencer. He competed in the individual épée event at the 2004 Summer Olympics, losing his only bout 6-15 and coming in 37th.
