= Alexey Tikhomirov =

Russian politician (born 1968)

- Алексей Тихомиров

Member of the State Duma
- Incumbent
- Assumed office 30 September 2026
- Preceded by: Constituency created
- Constituency: Zaporizhzhia (No. 93) (Note: His constituency, Zaporizhzhia, has been partially occupied by Russia since the 2022 Russian invasion of Ukraine. Ukraine still controls the northern parts of the constituency, including its seat, Zaporizhzhia, as of 2026. Russia later declared its annexation of Zaporizhzhia despite not controlling all of it. The UN General Assembly rejected the annexation under Resolution ES-11/4, and the vast majority of countries do not recognise it either. The constituency is still internationally considered part of Ukraine, although the portions that remain under Russian control are designated to be under Russian occupation.)

Personal details
- Born: Alexey Nikolaevich Tikhomirov; 11 May 1968 (age 58) Shymkent, Kazakh SSR, Soviet Union
- Party: United Russia
- Education: Ivan Kozhedub National University of the Air Force (1992); Russian Presidential Academy of National Economy and Public Administration (2017)

Alexey Nikolaevich Tikhomirov (Russian: Алексей Николаевич Тихомиров; born 11 May 1968) is a Russian and formerly Ukrainian politician and businessman who has served as a member of the State Duma of the 9th convocation for the United Russia party since 2026.

== Early life ==
Tikhomirov was born on 11 May 1968 in the city of Shymkent, which was then part of the Kazakh SSR in the Soviet Union. After graduating from secondary school, he did his mandatory military service in the Soviet Army starting in 1987, and in 1992, he graduated from the Ivan Kozhedub National University of the Air Force in Kharkiv, Ukraine. After graduating, he served in the Ukrainian Armed Forces until 1995. He left the army in 1995 and moved into the business sector when he became director of AZOT Krymenergoresurs in Crimea. After three eyars, he moved to being head of the enterprise "Arkon", a position he held until 2003. He was then appointed head of the State Control Division of the State Department of Motor Transport within the Ministry of Transport of Ukraine, while also being deputy director of "Atan-Crimea".

== Political career ==
=== 2002-2026: In Crimea ===
Tikhomirov first entered politics in 2002, when he was elected a deputy of the Feodosia City Council for one term until 2002. In 2010, he returned to politics when he was elected a deputy to the Verkhovna Rada of Crimea in its sixth convocation. At the end of his term there, the 2014 Russian annexation of Crimea took place, and Tikhomirov ended up siding with Russia. He then became deputy chairman of the Accounts Chamber of the Republic of Crimea until 2024, when he was elected a deputy to the State Council of Crimea with United Russia During this time, he also graduated from the Russian Presidential Academy of National Economy and Public Administration in 2017.

=== 2026-present: State Duma ===
In 2026, Tikhomirov announced his candidacy for the upcoming 2026 Russian legislative elections within the 9th convocation for United Russia. He decided to run in the newly-formed constituency No. 93, which represents Zaporizhzhia Oblast after it had been annexed by Russia in 2022 despite it not being recognised by the international community. In the end, he won with 55.99% or 56.82% of the vote, with his closest opponent being Yuriy Onyshchuk of A Just Russia, who got 19.87%, and Oleg Slyusarenko of the Communist Party of Russia, who got 12.65% of the vote.

== International sanctions ==
In 2026, Makarov was included on the international sanctions list of the European Union for his association with the United Russia party and for participating in elections in Zaporizhzhia. He has also been included on the French sanctions register as part of his sanctions under the EU, and the national asset freezing list of Monaco in compliance with the EU since 2026. In Ukraine, he has been included in the sanction list since 2018.

== Honours and awards ==
Tikhomirov has been awarded the following:

- Order "For Merit to the Fatherland" (2024)
