= Anatoliy Herey =

Ukrainian fencer (born 1989)

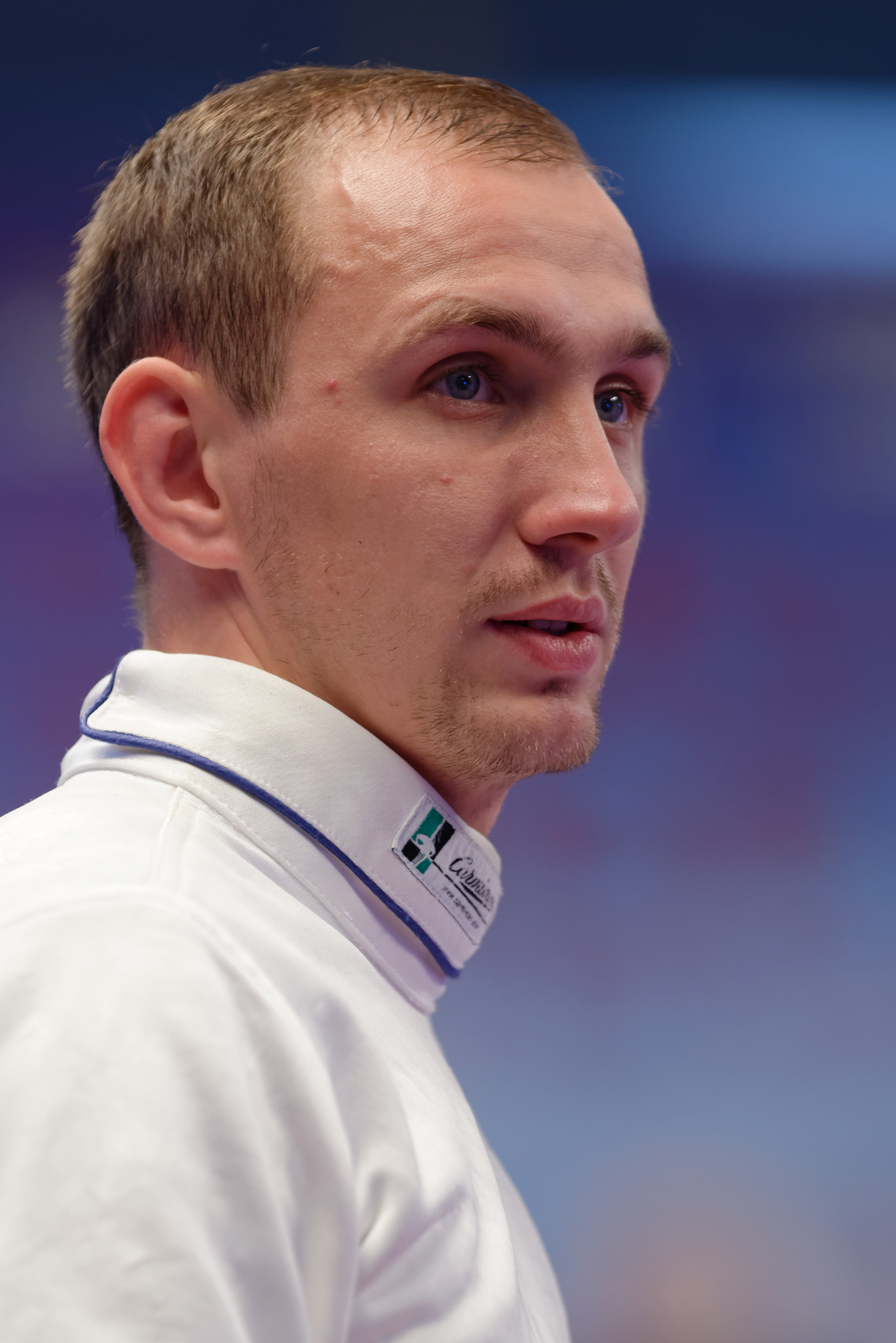
- Herey at the Challenge SNCF Réseau 2016

Personal information
- Full name: Anatoliy Antoliyovych Herey
- Born: 31 March 1989 (age 37) Uzhhorod, Zakarpattia Oblast, Ukrainian SSR, Soviet Union
- Height: 1.86 m (6 ft 1 in)
- Weight: 75 kg (165 lb)

Fencing career
- Sport: Fencing
- Country: Ukraine
- Weapon: Épée
- Hand: Right-handed
- National coach: Volodymyr Stankevych
- Club: Dynamo Kyiv
- Head coach: Mikhail Podolskiy
- FIE ranking: current ranking
Medal record
World Championships
Gold medal – first place	2015 Moscow	Team épée
Silver medal – second place	2013 Budapest	Team épée
Silver medal – second place	2019 Budapest	Team épée
European Championships
Silver medal – second place	2017 Tbilisi	Team épée
Bronze medal – third place	2012 Legnano	Team épée
Bronze medal – third place	2013 Zagreb	Team épée
Summer Universiade
Bronze medal – third place	2009 Belgrade	Team épée
Bronze medal – third place	2011 Shenzhen	Individual épée

Anatoliy Anatoliyovych Herey (Ukrainian: Анатолій Анатолійович Герей, romanized: Anatolij Antolijovyč Herej; born 31 March 1989) is a Ukrainian épée fencer, team silver medallist in the 2013 World Fencing Championships.

== Career ==
Herey comes from a fencing family: his father and uncle were honoured masters of sports for the USSR and became fencing coaches; his cousin Yulianna is a foil fencer. His first international distinction was a bronze medal at the 2008 U23 European Championships 2008 in Monza. A year later he won a silver medal both in the individual and team events of the Junior World Championships in Belfast in what was hailed as a renaissance for Ukrainian épée fencing.

Herey began fencing in the senior category in the 2009–10 season, earning a bronze medal in the 2010 Buenos Aires World Cup. He joined the Ukraine national team in the 2010–11 season and took part in the European Championships in Sheffield. Ukraine was defeated by France in the semi-finals, then by Russia, and finished fourth. Herey also participated in the 2011 World Championships in Catania. He defeated Switzerland's Benjamin Steffen in the first round, then ceded to Italy's Paolo Pizzo, who would eventually win the competition.

In the 2012 European Championships at Legnano Ukraine fell against Hungary, but overcame France in the small final to take the bronze medal. The scenario was repeated in the 2013 edition at Zagreb. At the World Championships in Budapest Herey lost in the first round to Italy's Enrico Garozzo. In the team event Ukraine edged past Russia in the table of 16, Herey suffering a 10–5 loss against Pavel Sukhov. then defeated the Czech Republic and France to meet Hungary in the final. They were overcome 42–38 and took a silver medal, the best result in Ukrainian history for men's épée.

In the 2013–14 season Herey won the Oslo satellite tournament beating Tor Forsse in the final and reached the quarter-finals in the Legnano Grand Prix. He was stopped by Russia's Anton Avdeev in the table of 16 of the European Championships in Strasbourg. In the team event, Ukraine were edged out by Switzerland in the semi-finals, then lost to Russia to take the fourth place. In the World Championships Herey ceded in the second round to Korea's Park Sang-young. In the team event, Ukraine lost in the quarter-finals to South Korea, which eventually took the silver medal. Herey finished the season No.35 in World rankings, a personal best as of 2014.

Herey was educated at the National University of Physical Education and Sport of Ukraine in Kyiv. He used to play the bass guitar in a band, but his father feared he would spread himself too thin and asked him to choose between fencing and music.

== Medal record (Individual) ==
=== World Cup ===
Year	Location	Event	Position
2010	Buenos Aires, Argentina	Individual Men's Épée	3rd

=== Grand Prix ===
Year	Location	Event	Position
2016	Rio de Janeiro, Brazil	Individual Men's Épée	3rd

=== Satellite ===
Year	Location	Event	Position
2011	Belgrade, Serbia	Individual Men's Épée	1st
2012	Ashkelon, Israel	Individual Men's Épée	1st
2013	Oslo, Norway	Individual Men's Épée	1st
2015	Belgrade, Serbia	Individual Men's Épée	2nd
2018	Oslo, Norway	Individual Men's Épée	2nd
2019	Oslo, Norway	Individual Men's Épée	1st
