= Sergey Kochetkov =

Russian fencer

Personal information
- Born: 7 August 1973 (age 52) Moscow, Russia

Sport
- Sport: Fencing

Sergey Kochetkov (born 7 August 1973) is a Russian fencer. He competed in the individual and team épée events at the 2004 Summer Olympics.
