= Andrés Carillo =

Cuban fencer (born 1980)

Personal information
- Born: 16 August 1980 (age 45) Havana, Cuba

Sport
- Sport: Fencing
Medal record
Representing Cuba
Pan American Games
Gold medal – first place	2003 Santo Domingo	Team épée
Gold medal – first place	2007 Rio de Janeiro	Team épée
Silver medal – second place	2007 Rio de Janeiro	Individual épée

Andrés Marcel Carillo Ayala (born 16 August 1980) is a Cuban fencer. He competed in the individual épée event at the 2004 Summer Olympics.
