= Ahmed Nabil (fencer) =

Egyptian fencer

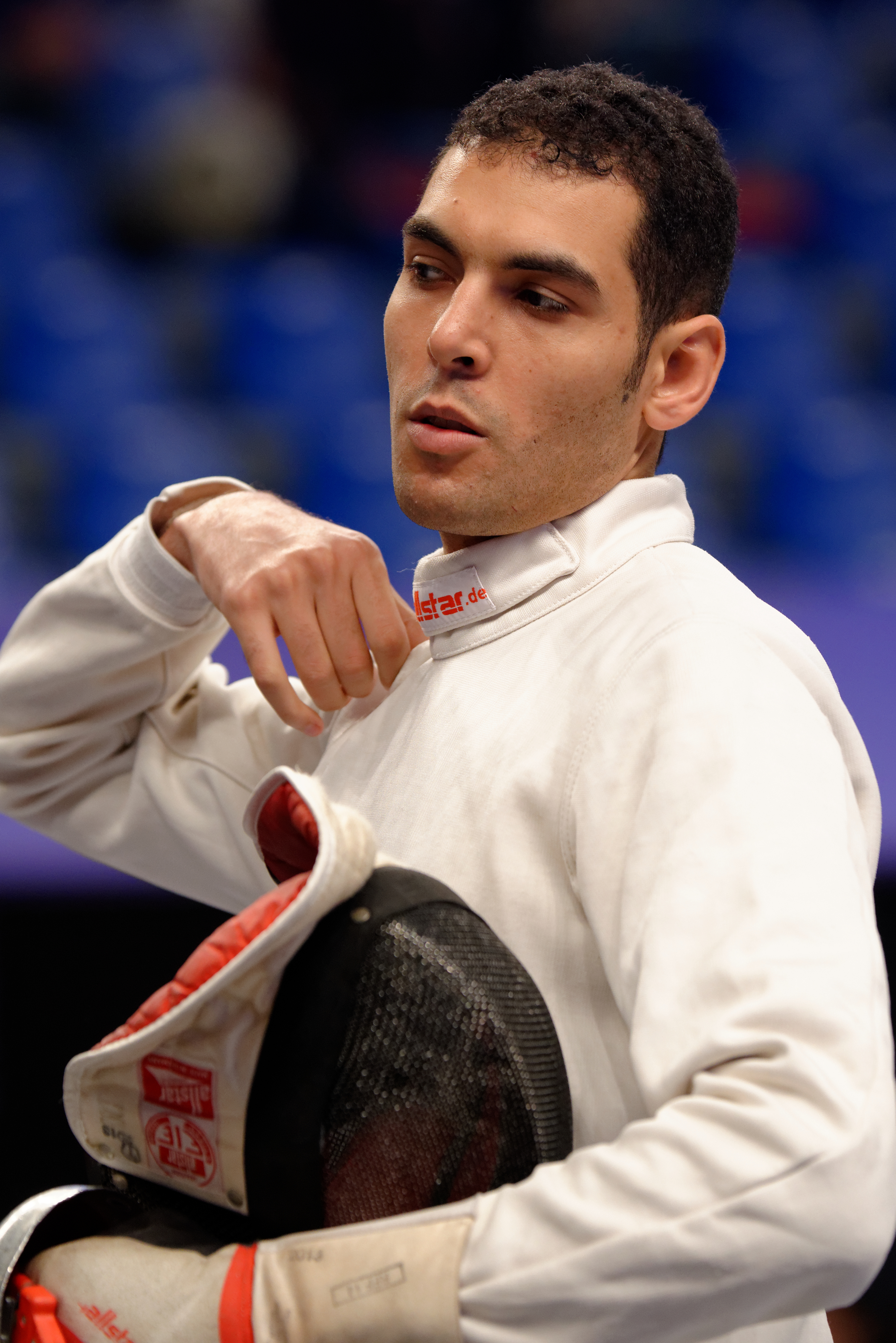
- At the 2014 Paris World Cup

Personal information
- Full name: Ahmed Nabil Khader
- Born: 19 January 1986 (age 40)
- Height: 1.96 m (6 ft 5 in)
- Weight: 83 kg (183 lb)

Fencing career
- Sport: Fencing
- Country: Egypt
- Weapon: épée
- Hand: left-handed
- FIE ranking: current ranking

Ahmed Nabil Khader (Arabic: أحمد نبيل خضر, born 19 January 1986) is an Egyptian fencer. He competed in the épée events at the 2004 and 2008 Summer Olympics.
