= Aissam Rami =

Moroccan fencer

Personal information
- Born: 8 May 1975 (age 51) France

Sport
- Sport: Fencing

Aissam Rami (born 8 May 1975) is a Moroccan fencer. He competed in the individual épée events at the 2004 and 2008 Summer Olympics.
