= Nikolai Novosjolov =

Estonian fencer (born 1980)

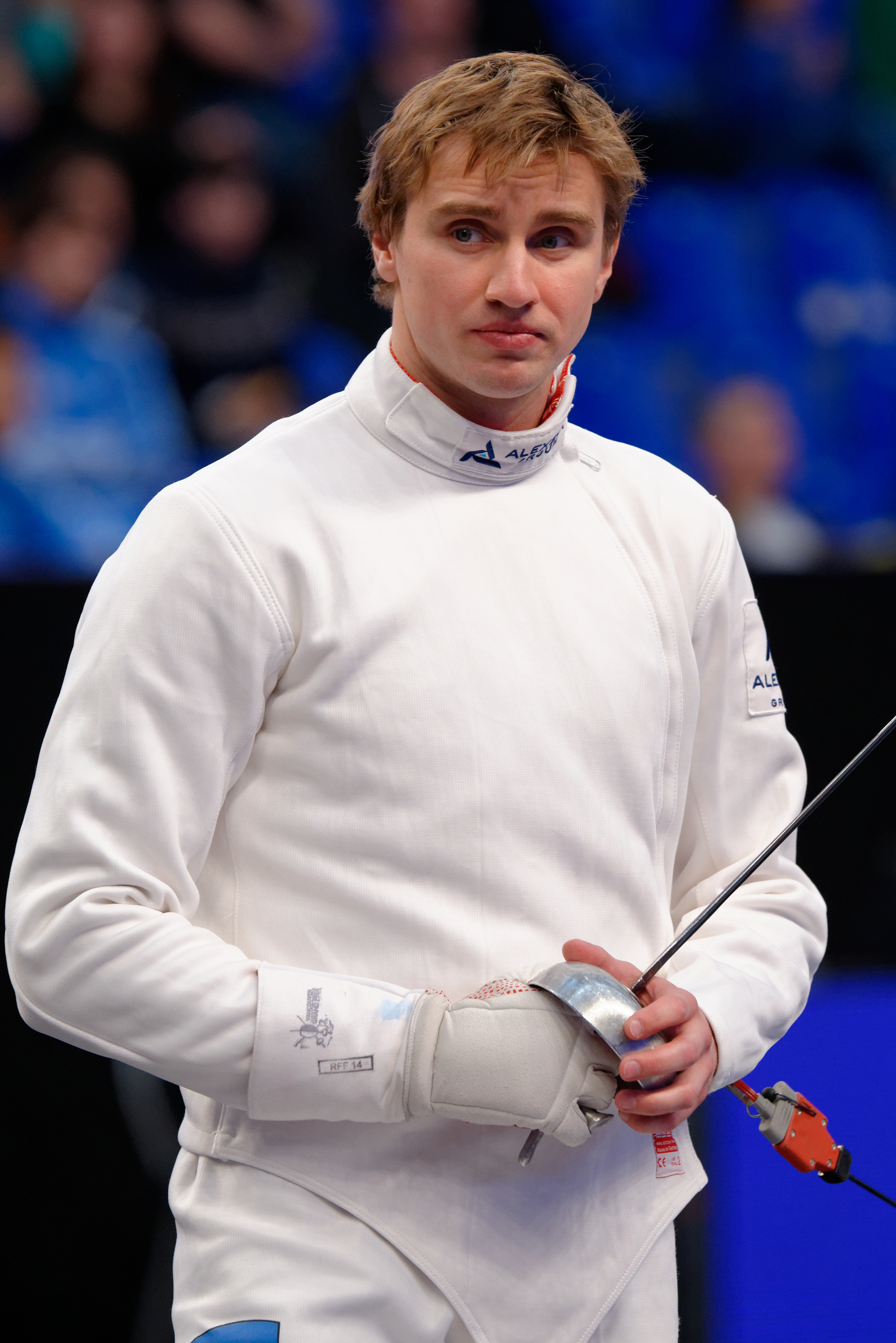
- Novosjolov at the 2014 Trophée Monal

Personal information
- Born: 9 June 1980 (age 46) Haapsalu, then part of Estonian SSR, Soviet Union
- Height: 1.90 m (6 ft 3 in)
- Weight: 90 kg (198 lb)

Fencing career
- Sport: Fencing
- Country: Estonia
- Weapon: Épée
- Hand: Right-handed
- FIE ranking: current ranking
Medal record
World Championships
Gold medal – first place	2010 Paris	Individual épée
Gold medal – first place	2013 Budapest	Individual épée
Silver medal – second place	2001 Nîmes	Team épée
Silver medal – second place	2017 Leipzig	Individual épée
European Championships
Silver medal – second place	2012 Legnano	Individual épée
Silver medal – second place	2015 Montreux	Team épée
Silver medal – second place	2018 Novi Sad	Individual épée
Bronze medal – third place	2017 Tbilisi	Individual épée
Universiade
Bronze medal – third place	2001 Beijing	Individual épée

Nikolai Novosjolov (born 9 June 1980) is an Estonian right-handed épée fencer, two-time individual world champion, and four-time Olympian.

Novosjolov competed in the 2000 Sydney Olympic Games, the 2008 Beijing Olympic Games, the 2012 London Olympic Games, and the 2016 Rio de Janeiro Olympic Games.

== Medal Record ==
=== World Championship ===
Year	Location	Event	Position
2001	Nîmes, France	Team Men's Épée	2nd
2010	Paris, France	Individual Men's Épée	1st
2013	Budapest, Hungary	Individual Men's Épée	1st
2017	Leipzig, Germany	Individual Men's Épée	2nd

=== European Championship ===
Year	Location	Event	Position
2012	Legnano, Italy	Individual Men's Épée	2nd
2015	Montreux, Switzerland	Team Men's Épée	2nd
2017	(Georgia (country)) Tbilisi, Georgia	Individual Men's Épée	3rd
2018	Novi Sad, Serbia	Individual Men's Épée	2nd

=== Grand Prix ===
Date	Location	Event	Position
06/12/2009	Bogotá, Colombia	Individual Men's Épée	1st
05/14/2011	Stockholm, Sweden	Individual Men's Épée	3rd
02/10/2012	Doha, Qatar	Individual Men's Épée	3rd
05/12/2012	Stockholm, Sweden	Individual Men's Épée	1st
01/18/2013	Doha, Qatar	Individual Men's Épée	3rd
03/23/2013	Vancouver, Canada	Individual Men's Épée	2nd
03/22/2014	Vancouver, Canada	Individual Men's Épée	2nd
03/20/2015	Budapest, Hungary	Individual Men's Épée	1st
12/09/2016	Doha, Qatar	Individual Men's Épée	3rd

=== World Cup ===
Date	Location	Event	Position
02/13/2010	Tallinn, Estonia	Individual Men's Épée	1st
03/04/2011	Tallinn, Estonia	Individual Men's Épée	3rd
03/02/2012	Tallinn, Estonia	Individual Men's Épée	1st
05/03/2013	Paris, France	Individual Men's Épée	3rd
10/23/2015	Bern, Switzerland	Individual Men's Épée	3rd
05/11/2018	Paris, France	Individual Men's Épée	1st

== Orders ==
- Order of the White Star, 3rd Class

Awards
Preceded by Andrus Veerpalu	Estonian Athlete of the Year; 2010	Succeeded by Gerd Kanter
Preceded by Heiki Nabi	Estonian Athlete of the Year; 2013	Succeeded by Rasmus Mägi
