= Robert Andrzejuk =

Polish fencer (born 1975)

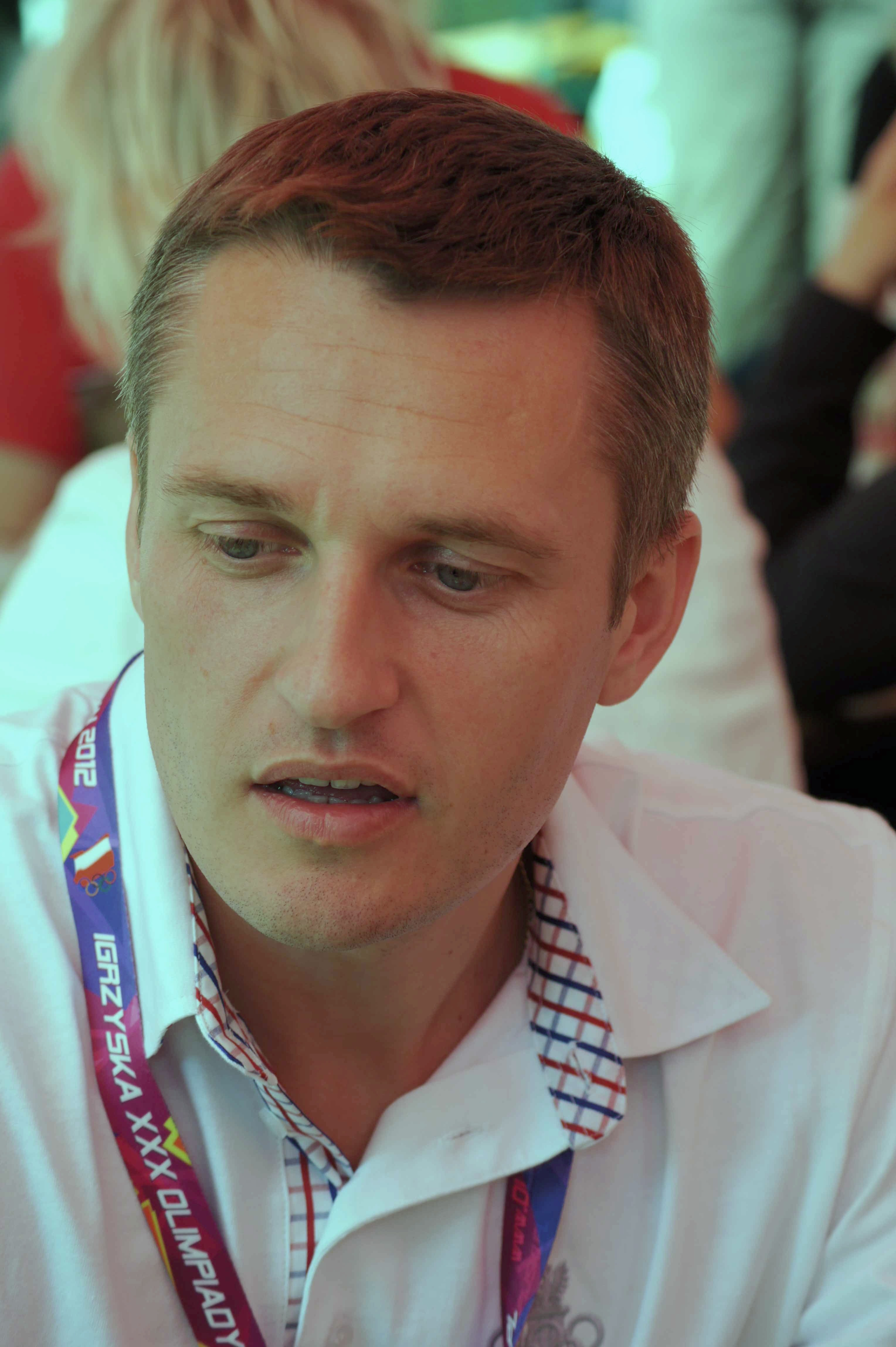
- Andrzejuk in 2011

Personal information
- Born: 17 July 1975 (age 50)
Medal record
Representing Poland
Men's Fencing
Olympic Games
Silver medal – second place	2008 Beijing	Team Épée

Robert Sebastian Andrzejuk (born 17 July 1975 in Wrocław, Dolnośląskie) is a Polish fencer who won a silver medal in Men's Team Épée (Fencing) at the 2008 Summer Olympics in Beijing, together with Tomasz Motyka, Adam Wiercioch, and Radosław Zawrotniak.

In 2007, he married a fencer and politician Danuta Dmowska.

== Awards ==
- Golden Cross of Merit in 2008.
