= Giorgos Abalof =

Greek fencer (born 1982)

Personal information
- Born: 5 January 1982 (age 44) Soviet Union

Sport
- Sport: Fencing

Giorgos Abalof (born 5 January 1982) is a Soviet-born Greek fencer. He competed in the individual épée event at the 2004 Summer Olympics.
