= Sten Priinits =

Estonian fencer

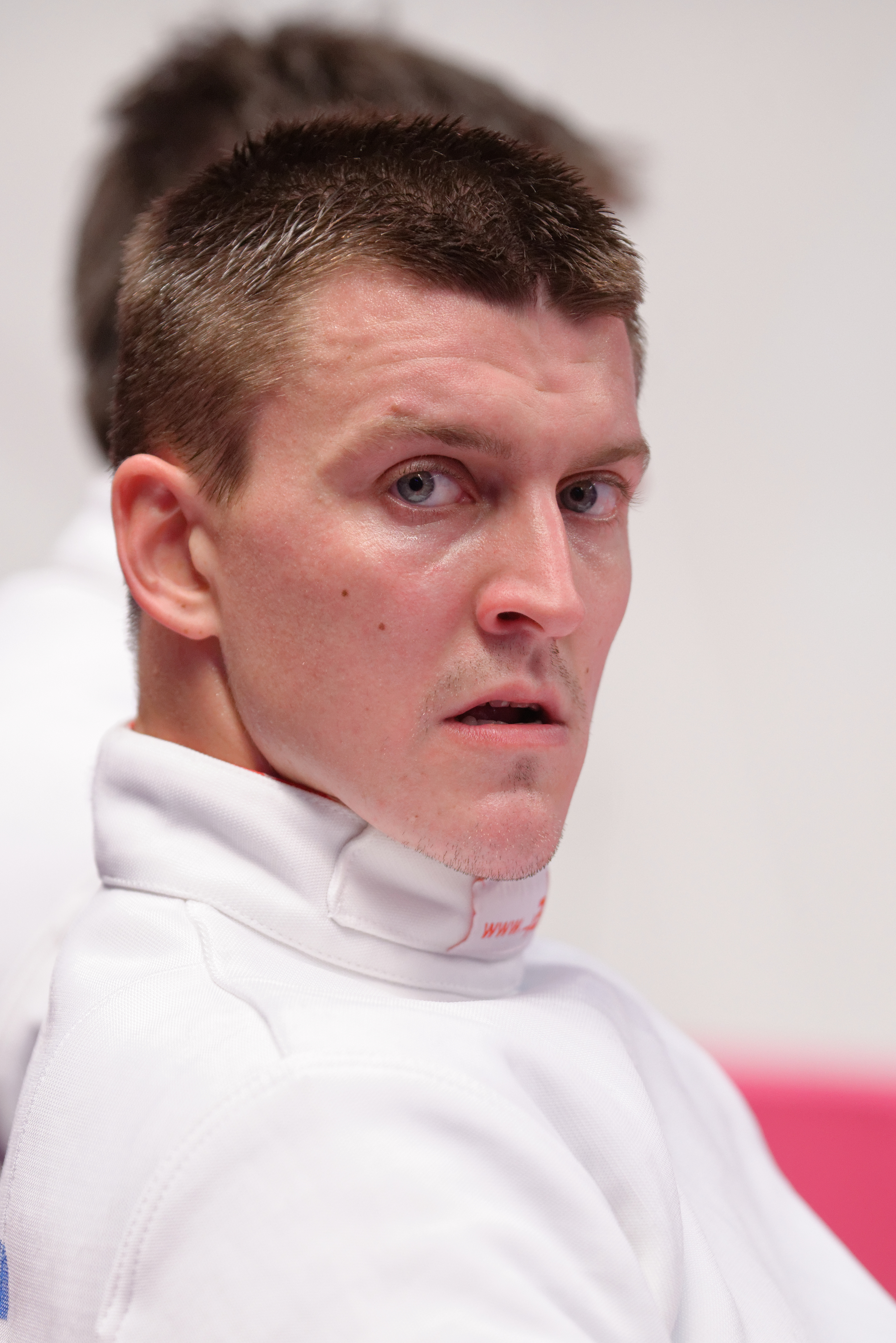
Sten Priinits

Sten Priinits (born 10 November 1987) is an Estonian fencer.

He was born in Haapsalu. In 2017 he graduated from Tallinn University in physical education.

He began his fencing career in 1994, coached by his mother Helen Nelis-Naukas and uncle Peeter Nelis. His grandfather was fencer and coach Endel Nelis. He won silver medal at 2015 European Fencing Championships in team épée. He is multiple-times Estonian champion. Since 2009 he is a member of Estonian national fencing team.
