= Seamus Robinson (fencer) =

Australian fencer

Personal information
- Born: 1 April 1975 (age 51) Melbourne, Australia

Sport
- Country: Australia
- Sport: Fencing
- Club: The Fencing Club, Brisbane Sydney Beyond Fencing Club, Sydney

Seamus Robinson (born 1 April 1975 in Melbourne, Australia) was the first Australian fencer to win a Fencing World Championship title in the men's épée cadets (under 17) title in 1991, Foggia, Italy. He also placed second on the junior men's épée world cup in 1995.

Other results include:

- 1997, 1998 Italian open 1st Bari & Ravenna
- 1998 Commonwealth fencing Championships Kuala Lumpur -1st
- 2003 World Cup : Cuba – 6th
- 2003 World Cup : Tehran – 7th
- 2003 World Championships:Cuba -12th
- 2004 World Cup: Innsbruck – 11th
- 2007 World Cup Sydney – 2nd
- 2008 World Cup Puerto Rico – 6th
- 2011 World Championships Catania- 26th

Robinson competed at the 2004 Summer Olympics in Athens, losing in the second round to eventual bronze medal winner Pavel Kolobkov.
