= Igor Turchin (fencer) =

Russian fencer (born 1982)

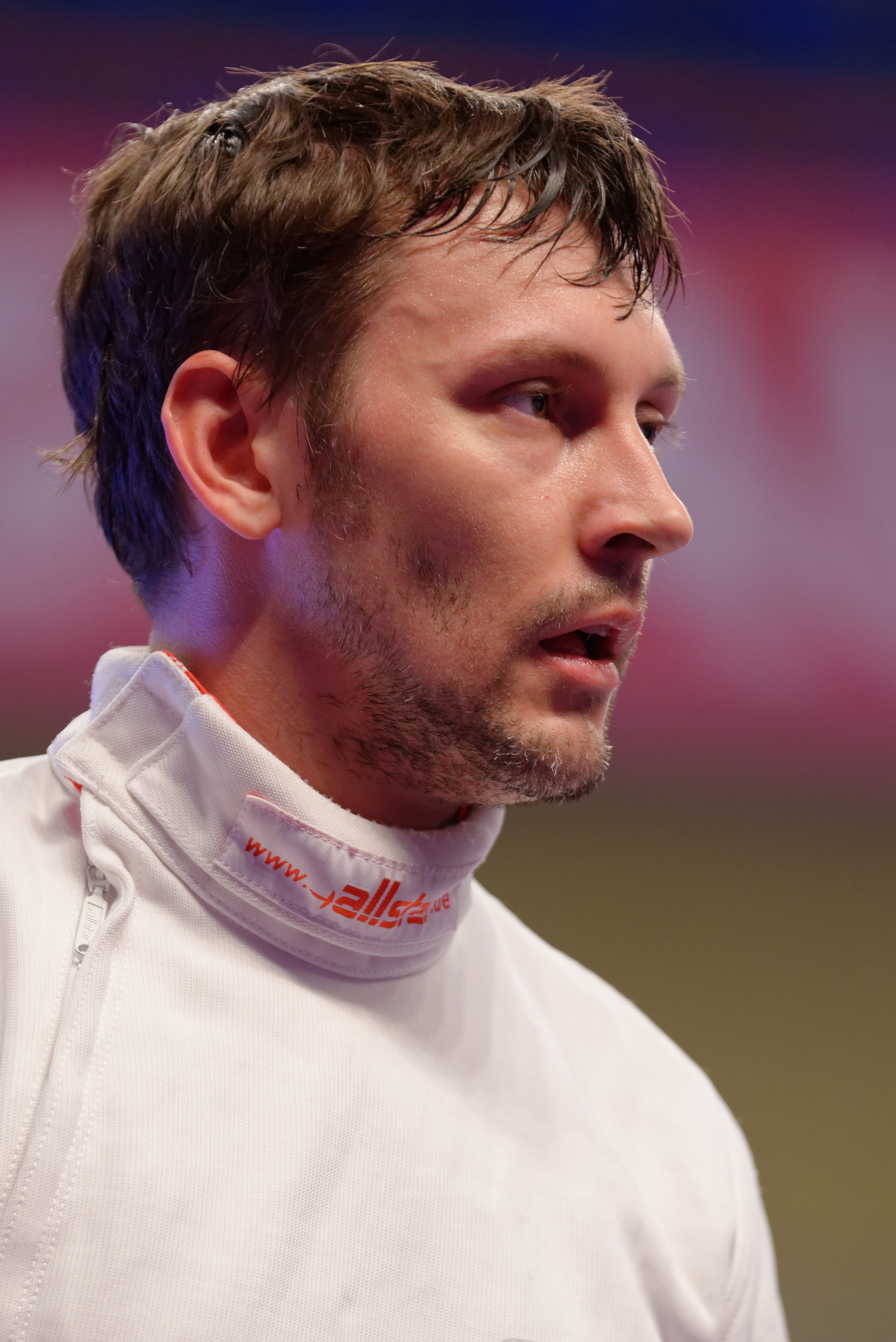
- Turchin in 2015

Personal information
- Full name: Igor Vyacheslavovich Turchin
- Born: 13 May 1982 (age 44) Saratov, Russia
- Height: 1.77 m (5 ft 10 in)
- Weight: 71 kg (157 lb)

Fencing career
- Sport: Fencing
- Weapon: Épée
- Hand: Left-handed
- FIE ranking: current ranking
Medal record
Men's épée fencing
Representing Russia
World Championships
Gold medal – first place	2003 Havana	Team épée

Igor Vyacheslavovich Turchin (Russian: Игорь Вячеславович Турчин; born 13 May 1982) is a Russian former fencer, team World champion in 2003. He competed in the individual and team épée events at the 2004 Summer Olympics.
