= Joaquim Videira =

Portuguese fencer

Personal information
- Born: 1984 (age 41–42)
Medal record
Men's fencing
World Championships
Silver medal – second place	2006 Turin	Épée

Joaquim Filipe Ferreira dos Santos Videira (born 12 January 1984) is a Portuguese fencer from Viseu. He was the épée world vice champion in 2006.

== Biography ==
Joaquim Videira started fencing under the direction of his coach, the Hélder Alves.

In 2006, he won the silver medal in the World Fencing Championships (best result ever for Portuguese fencing) losing in a sudden death period. He has also won medals in Grand Prix and World Cups.

He represented the following clubs:

- Presently - Associação dos Antigos Alunos do Colégio Militar
- 2004-2006 - Centro de Convívio e Desportivo de Vale de Milhaços
- 2002-2004 - Associação dos Pupilos do Exército
- 1996-2002 - Instituto Militar dos Pupilos do Exército

Joaquim Videira was supported by the project Olympic Hopes in 2005 and he integrates the Beijing 2008 Project since 2006 in its higher level (Level 1 - Medal winner) from the National Olympic Committee of Portugal.

He is one of a few competition fencers who use the French grip as opposed to the pistol.

It is important to distinguish the fair play of this athlete which has given him the Fair Play Award of the National Olympic Committee of Portugal. During a fight in the World Championship, Videira refused a point after he touched with his sword on the floor. He convinced the jury but lost the combat being eliminated from the competition.

At the Beijing Olympics in 2008 he was eliminated in the second round.

Videira is also an Electronics Engineer with a degree from the Faculty of Engineering of the Oporto's University. He will follow his academic studies by taking a master's degree.

== Accomplishments ==
Individual results up to 10th place

2008

- 6th Lisbon World Cup
- 8th Bern World Cup

2007

- 1st Sydney World Cup
- 3rd Paris World Cup
- 3rd Bogotá World Cup
- 3rd World Ranking (Best ever)

2006

- 2nd Turin World Championships
- 5th Montreal Grand Prix
- 9th Kish Island World Cup

2005

- 7th Copenhagen European Championships

Youth (2000-2005)

- 3rd Ponte de Sôr World Cup
- 3rd Cairo World Cup
- 3rd Conegliano European Junior Championships
- 5th Helsinki World Cup
- 5th Catania World Cup
- 5th Bratislava World Cup
- 5th Junior World Ranking
- 6th Luxemburg World Cup

== Awards ==
- Aquilino Ribeiro Trophy, Sports Trophy given by the Jornal do Centro in 2007
- Olympic Medal given by the National Olympic Committee of Portugal in 2007
- Nomination for Athlete of the Year by the Portugal Sports Confederation in 2006
- Fair Play award given by the National Olympic Committee of Portugal in 2004
- Fencing Youth Hope given by the Portugal Sports Confederation in 2004
- Honors of the Youth Award given by the National Olympic Committee of Portugal in 2002
