= Bas Verwijlen =

Dutch fencer (born 1983)

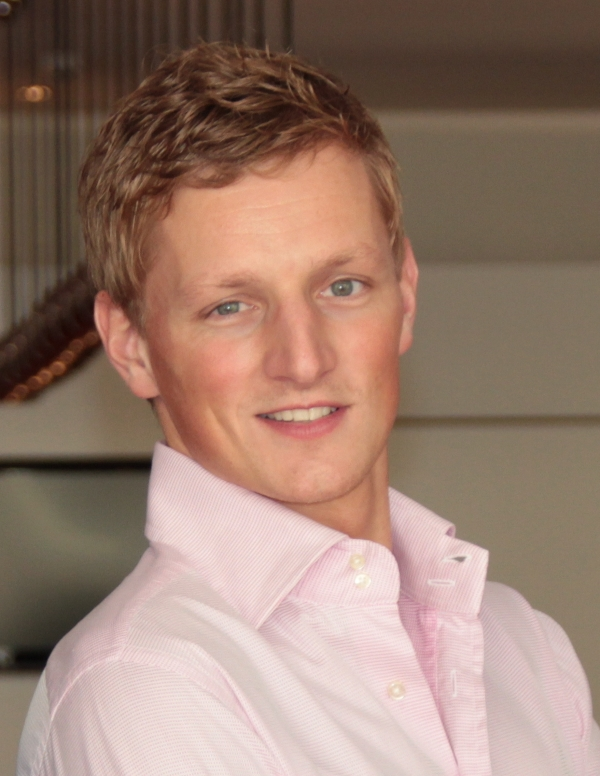
- Bas Verwijlen in 2012

Personal information
- Born: 1 October 1983 (age 43) Oss, Netherlands
- Height: 1.90 m (6 ft 3 in)
- Weight: 80 kg (176 lb)

Fencing career
- Sport: Fencing
- Country: Netherlands
- Weapon: épée
- Hand: right-handed
- Club: SC Den Bosch
- FIE ranking: current ranking
Medal record
World Championships
Silver medal – second place	2011 Catania	Épée
Bronze medal – third place	2005 Leipzig	Épée
European Championships
Silver medal – second place	2011 Sheffield	Épée

Bas Verwijlen (born 1 October 1983) is a Dutch right-handed épée fencer and four-time Olympian.

He started fencing when he was five years old at fencing club Zaal Verwijlen in Oss, owned by his father Roel Verwijlen, who is also the Dutch national coach. Until he was twelve years old, he fenced in two different weapons, but he has since chosen to focus on the épée. He became part of the Dutch national team and took part in the Universiade (17th in Beijing, 2001), Youth Olympics, Dutch national championships, but also European and World Championships. As a junior, he won eleven national titles, he became third at the World Championships under-16 in the United States and represented the Netherlands at every European and World Championship since 1998. He won two World Cups for Juniors, a performance never achieved by another fencer.

It was time for his senior career and also managed to achieve World class performances there. At the 2005 World Championships in Leipzig he won the bronze medal. At the European Championships 2005 in Zalaegerszeg he and his Dutch teammates came sixth in the nations tournament. He reached the final and became second at the 2006 European Championships in İzmir. After the Grand Prix meeting in Stockholm in 2008 he was secure of qualification for the 2008 Summer Olympics in Beijing. In the preparations for this tournament he won the World Cup meeting in Cali, Colombia in June and he also won the Dutch national title. At the 2008 Summer Olympics he reached the last eight, losing to the eventual gold medalist, Matteo Tagliariol.

At the 2011 European Championships, he finished in 2nd place, a result he repeated at the 2011 World Championships. He qualified for the 2012 Summer Olympics, finishing in 13th place, despite a knee injury.

== Medal Record ==
=== World Championship ===
Year	Location	Event	Position
2005	Leipzig, Germany	Individual Men's Épée	3rd
2011	Catania, Italy	Individual Men's Épée	2nd

=== European Championship ===
Year	Location	Event	Position
2011	Sheffield, United Kingdom	Individual Men's Épée	2nd

=== Grand Prix ===
Date	Location	Event	Position
28 March 2003	Bogotá, Colombia	Individual Men's Épée	3rd
5 November 2007	Paris, France	Individual Men's Épée	3rd
25 January 2008	Kuwait City, Kuwait	Individual Men's Épée	3rd
2 October 2012	Doha, Qatar	Individual Men's Épée	3rd
12 April 2015	Doha, Qatar	Individual Men's Épée	3rd

=== World Cup ===
Date	Location	Event	Position
21 May 2005	Tallinn, Estonia	Individual Men's Épée	3rd
7 August 2005	Vancouver, Canada	Individual Men's Épée	2nd
16 July 2005	Tehran, Iran	Individual Men's Épée	1st
15 July 2006	Tehran, Iran	Individual Men's Épée	3rd
1 December 2007	Kish Island, Iran	Individual Men's Épée	2nd
2 February 2007	Legnano, Italy	Individual Men's Épée	3rd
14 June 2008	Cali, Colombia	Individual Men's Épée	1st
1 October 2009	Kish Island, Iran	Individual Men's Épée	1st
14 February 2009	Tallinn, Estonia	Individual Men's Épée	3rd
26 March 2010	Heidenheim, Germany	Individual Men's Épée	2nd
26 June 2010	Buenos Aires, Argentina	Individual Men's Épée	2nd
3 April 2011	Tallinn, Estonia	Individual Men's Épée	3rd
21 February 2014	Tallinn, Estonia	Individual Men's Épée	2nd
23 October 2015	Bern, Switzerland	Individual Men's Épée	1st
5 November 2018	Paris, France	Individual Men's Épée	3rd
23 November 2018	Bern, Switzerland	Individual Men's Épée	2nd
2 July 2020	Vancouver, Canada	Individual Men's Épée	1st
