= Paris Inostroza =

Chilean fencer (born 1972)

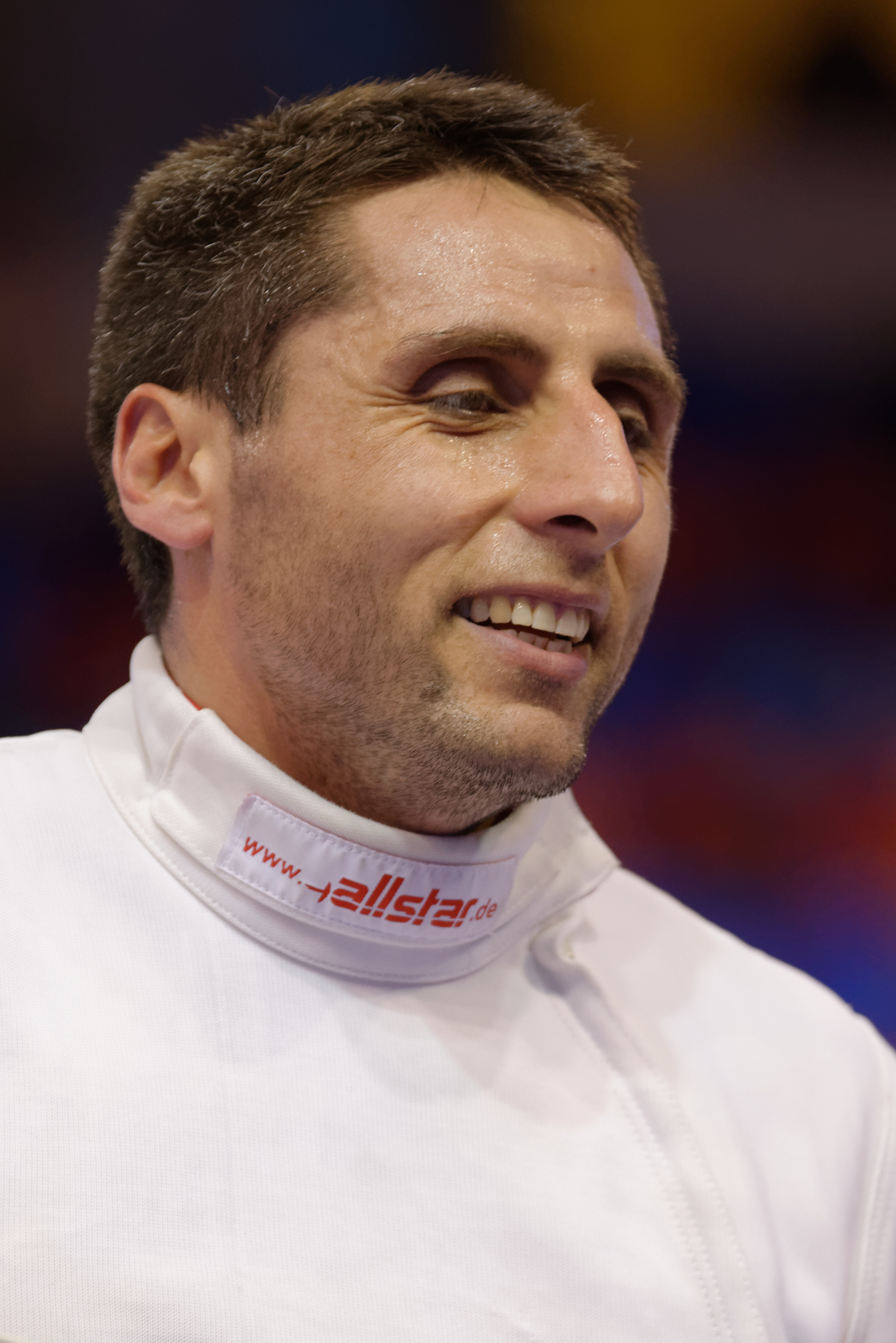

Personal information
- Born: 22 September 1972 (age 53) Santiago, Chile

Sport
- Sport: Fencing
Medal record
Fencing
Representing Chile
Pan American Games
Silver medal – second place	1999 Winnipeg	Team Epée
Bronze medal – third place	1995 Mar del Plata	Epée
Bronze medal – third place	2003 Sto Domingo	Epée
Bronze medal – third place	2007 Río de Janeiro	Epée
South American Games
Gold medal – first place	1998 Cuenca	Team Epée
Gold medal – first place	2002 Rio de Janeiro	Team Epée
Silver medal – second place	1990 Lima	Team Epée
Silver medal – second place	2010 Medellín	Team Epée
Bronze medal – third place	1990 Lima	Epée
Bronze medal – third place	2006 Buenos Aires	Team Epée
Bronze medal – third place	2010 Medellín	Epée
Bronze medal – third place	2014 Santiago	Epée

Paris Inostroza (born 22 September 1972) is a Chilean former fencer. He competed in the individual épée events at the 1996, 2004, 2008, and 2012 Summer Olympics.
