= Fencing at the 2002 Asian Games =

- Venue: Gangseo Gymnasium
- Dates: 29 September – 4 October 2002
- Competitors: 154 from 17 nations

Fencing at the 2002 Asian Games was held in Gangseo Gymnasium, Busan, South Korea from September 29 to October 4, 2002.

== Schedule ==
P	Pools	F	Finals

Event↓/Date →	29th Sun		30th Mon		1st Tue		2nd Wed	3rd Thu	4th Fri
Men's individual épée	P	F							
Men's team épée							F		
Men's individual foil	P	F							
Men's team foil							F		
Men's individual sabre					P	F			
Men's team sabre									F
Women's individual épée					P	F			
Women's team épée									F
Women's individual foil			P	F					
Women's team foil								F	
Women's individual sabre			P	F					
Women's team sabre								F	

== Medalists ==
=== Men ===
Event	Gold	Silver	Bronze
Individual épée	Zhao Gang; China	Wang Lei; China	Sergey Shabalin; Kazakhstan
Team épée	Kazakhstan; Alexandr Axenov; Dmitriy Dimov; Sergey Shabalin; Alexey Shipilov	China; Wang Lei; Xie Yongjun; Zhao Chunsheng; Zhao Gang	South Korea; Kim Jung-kwan; Ku Kyo-dong; Lee Sang-yup; Yang Roy-sung
Individual foil	Wang Haibin; China	Kim Sang-hun; South Korea	Wu Hanxiong; China
Team foil	China; Wang Haibin; Wu Hanxiong; Zhang Jie; Zhou Rui	South Korea; Choi Byung-chul; Kim Sang-hun; Kim Young-ho; Lee Kwan-haeng	Japan; Yusuke Fukuda; Takashi Okano; Naoto Okazaki; Hayato Shibuki
Individual sabre	Lee Seung-won; South Korea	Wang Jingzhi; China	Kim Doo-hong; South Korea
Team sabre	South Korea; Kim Doo-hong; Lee Hyuk; Lee Seung-won; Seo Sung-jun	China; Chen Feng; Wang Jingzhi; Zhao Chunsheng; Zhou Hanming	Kazakhstan; Yevgeniy Frolov; Sergey Sleptsov; Sergey Smirnov; Igor Tsel

=== Women ===
Event	Gold	Silver	Bronze
Individual épée	Kim Hee-jeong; South Korea	Hyun Hee; South Korea	Shen Weiwei; China
Team épée	South Korea; Hyun Hee; Kim Hee-jeong; Kim Mi-jung; Lee Keum-nam	China; Li Na; Shen Weiwei; Zhang Li; Zhong Weiping	Hong Kong; Bjork Cheng; Cheung Yi Nei; Ho Ka Lai; Yeung Chui Ling
Individual foil	Zhang Lei; China	Lim Mi-kyung; South Korea	Seo Mi-jung; South Korea
Team foil	South Korea; Lim Mi-kyung; Nam Hyun-hee; Oh Tae-young; Seo Mi-jung	China; Liu Yuan; Ma Na; Meng Jie; Zhang Lei	Japan; Yuko Arai; Madoka Hisagae; Chieko Sugawara; Mika Uchiyama
Individual sabre	Lee Shin-mi; South Korea	Lee Gyu-young; South Korea	Tan Xue; China
Team sabre	China; Bao Yingying; Huang Haiyang; Tan Xue; Zhang Ying	South Korea; Cho Kyung-mi; Kim Hee-yeon; Lee Gyu-young; Lee Shin-mi	Japan; Madoka Hisagae; Miyuki Kano; Chiyo Ogawa; Chieko Sugawara

== Medal table ==
Rank	Nation	Gold	Silver	Bronze	Total
1	South Korea (KOR)	6	6	3	15
2	China (CHN)	5	6	3	14
3	Kazakhstan (KAZ)	1	0	2	3
4	Japan (JPN)	0	0	3	3
5	Hong Kong (HKG)	0	0	1	1
Totals (5 entries)		12	12	12	36

== Participating nations ==
A total of 154 athletes from 17 nations competed in fencing at the 2002 Asian Games:

- China (23)
- Hong Kong (13)
- Japan (15)
- Jordan (3)
- Kazakhstan (12)
- Kuwait (10)
- Kyrgyzstan (8)
- Lebanon (3)
- Macau (4)
- Palestine (3)
- Philippines (12)
- Qatar (5)
- Saudi Arabia (8)
- South Korea (24)
- Thailand (5)
- Turkmenistan (3)
- Uzbekistan (3)
