= Fencing at the Asian Games =

- Governing bodies: FIE (World) / FCA (Asia)
- Events: 12 (men: 6; women: 6)

Games
- 1951; 1954; 1958; 1962; 1966; 1970; 1974; 1978; 1982; 1986; 1990; 1994; 1998; 2002; 2006; 2010; 2014; 2018; 2022; 2026
- Medalists

Fencing events have been contested at every Asian Games since 1974 Asian Games in Tehran. They were not included in the year 1982.

== Editions ==
| Games | Year | Host city | Best nation |
|---|---|---|---|
| VII | 1974 | Tehran, Iran | Japan |
| VIII | 1978 | Bangkok, Thailand | China |
| X | 1986 | Seoul, South Korea | China |
| XI | 1990 | Beijing, China | China |
| XII | 1994 | Hiroshima, Japan | China |
| XIII | 1998 | Bangkok, Thailand | South Korea |
| XIV | 2002 | Busan, South Korea | South Korea |
| XV | 2006 | Doha, Qatar | China |
| XVI | 2010 | Guangzhou, China | South Korea |
| XVII | 2014 | Incheon, South Korea | South Korea |
| XVIII | 2018 | Jakarta–Palembang, Indonesia | South Korea |
| XIX | 2022 | Hangzhou, China | South Korea |
| XX | 2026 | Aichi–Nagoya, Japan | Japan |

== Events ==
| Event | 74 | 78 | 86 | 90 | 94 | 98 | 02 | 06 | 10 | 14 | 18 | 22 | 26 | Years |
|---|---|---|---|---|---|---|---|---|---|---|---|---|---|---|
| Men's individual épée | X | X | X | X | X | X | X | X | X | X | X | X | X | 13 |
| Men's team épée | X | X | X | X | X | X | X | X | X | X | X | X | X | 13 |
| Men's individual foil | X | X | X | X | X | X | X | X | X | X | X | X | X | 13 |
| Men's team foil | X | X | X | X | X | X | X | X | X | X | X | X | X | 13 |
| Men's individual sabre | X | X | X | X | X | X | X | X | X | X | X | X | X | 13 |
| Men's team sabre | X | X | X | X | X | X | X | X | X | X | X | X | X | 13 |
| Women's individual épée | | | | X | | X | X | X | X | X | X | X | X | 9 |
| Women's team épée | | | | X | | X | X | X | X | X | X | X | X | 9 |
| Women's individual foil | X | X | X | X | X | X | X | X | X | X | X | X | X | 13 |
| Women's team foil | X | X | X | X | X | X | X | X | X | X | X | X | X | 13 |
| Women's individual sabre | | | | | | | X | X | X | X | X | X | X | 7 |
| Women's team sabre | | | | | | | X | X | X | X | X | X | X | 7 |
| Total | 8 | 8 | 8 | 10 | 8 | 10 | 12 | 12 | 12 | 12 | 12 | 12 | 12 | 136 |

== Medal table ==
| Rank | Nation | Gold | Silver | Bronze | Total |
|---|---|---|---|---|---|
| 1 | South Korea (KOR) | 52 | 46 | 36 | 134 |
| 2 | China (CHN) | 49 | 46 | 37 | 132 |
| 3 | Japan (JPN) | 15 | 16 | 45 | 76 |
| 4 | Iran (IRI) | 3 | 6 | 9 | 18 |
| 5 | Kazakhstan (KAZ) | 3 | 4 | 13 | 20 |
| 6 | Hong Kong (HKG) | 1 | 5 | 32 | 38 |
| 7 | Uzbekistan (UZB) | 1 | 0 | 2 | 3 |
| 8 | Indonesia (INA) | 0 | 1 | 2 | 3 |
| 9 | Singapore (SGP) | 0 | 0 | 2 | 2 |
| 9 | Thailand (THA) | 0 | 0 | 2 | 2 |
| 9 | Vietnam (VIE) | 0 | 0 | 2 | 2 |
| 12 | Israel (ISR) | 0 | 0 | 1 | 1 |
| 12 | Kuwait (KUW) | 0 | 0 | 1 | 1 |
| Totals (13 entries) | | 124 | 124 | 184 | 432 |
