= Fencing at the 1998 Asian Games =

- Venue: Thammasat Gymnasium 4
- Dates: 9–18 December 1998
- Nations: 13

Fencing at the 1998 Asian Games was held in Thammasat Gymnasium 4, Bangkok, Thailand from December 9 to December 18, 1998.

== Schedule ==
P	Pools	F	Finals

Event↓/Date →	9th Wed		10th Thu		11th Fri		12th Sat		13th Sun		14th Mon	15th Tue	16th Wed	17th Thu	18th Fri
Men's individual épée							P	F							
Men's team épée														F	
Men's individual foil			P	F											
Men's team foil												F			
Men's individual sabre									P	F					
Men's team sabre															F
Women's individual épée					P	F									
Women's team épée													F		
Women's individual foil	P	F													
Women's team foil											F				

== Medalists ==
=== Men ===
Event	Gold	Silver	Bronze
Individual épée	Yang Roy-sung; South Korea	Lee Sang-ki; South Korea	Zhao Gang; China
Team épée	South Korea; Choi Yong-chul; Lee Sang-ki; Lee Sang-yup; Yang Roy-sung	Kazakhstan; Alexandr Axenov; Dmitriy Dimov; Alexey Pistsov; Sergey Shabalin	China; Dong Zhaozhi; Wang Qibing; Xiao Jian; Zhao Gang
Individual foil	Wang Haibin; China	Kim Young-ho; South Korea	You Bong-hyung; South Korea
Team foil	China; Dong Zhaozhi; Lin Liang; Liu Yuntao; Wang Haibin	Japan; Yusuke Aoki; Hiroki Fujii; Hiroki Ichigatani; Naoto Okazaki	South Korea; Kim Seung-pyo; Kim Woon-sung; Kim Young-ho; You Bong-hyung
Individual sabre	Guo Rong; China	Ko Young-tae; South Korea	Zhang Lin; China
Team sabre	South Korea; Kim Doo-hong; Ko Young-tae; Lee Hyun-soo; Seo Sung-jun	China; Guo Rong; Liu Yuntao; Yan Weidong; Zhang Lin	Iran; Peyman Fakhri; Mohammad Mirmohammadi; Amir Mohaymen Rahimi; Abbas Sheikholeslami

=== Women ===
Event	Gold	Silver	Bronze
Individual épée	Ko Jung-sun; South Korea	Shen Weiwei; China	Yang Shaoqi; China
Team épée	China; Liang Qin; Liang Shuxian; Shen Weiwei; Yang Shaoqi	South Korea; Kim Kyung-ja; Ko Jung-sun; Lee Keum-nam; Lee Myung-hee	Japan; Yuko Arai; Toshi Obata; Chieko Okada; Remi Shozui
Individual foil	Xiao Aihua; China	Lim Mi-kyung; South Korea	Du Yunjie; China
Team foil	South Korea; Chun Mi-kyung; Lim Mi-kyung; Kim Dong-im; Lee Tae-hee	China; Du Yunjie; Huang Minna; Wang Huifeng; Xiao Aihua	Japan; Yuko Arai; Masako Kobayashi; Chieko Okada; Miwako Shimada

== Medal table ==
Rank	Nation	Gold	Silver	Bronze	Total
1	South Korea (KOR)	5	5	2	12
2	China (CHN)	5	3	5	13
3	Japan (JPN)	0	1	2	3
4	Kazakhstan (KAZ)	0	1	0	1
5	Iran (IRI)	0	0	1	1
Totals (5 entries)		10	10	10	30

== Participating nations ==
- China (18)
- Hong Kong (11)
- Indonesia (6)
- Iran (9)
- Japan
- Kazakhstan
- Kuwait
- Kyrgyzstan
- North Korea (4)
- Philippines
- South Korea (20)
- Thailand
- Uzbekistan (4)
