= Fencing at the 2006 Asian Games =

- Venue: Al-Arabi Indoor Hall
- Dates: 9–14 December 2006
- Competitors: 222 from 21 nations

Fencing was contested at the 2006 Asian Games in Doha, Qatar from December 9 to December 14. Men's and women's competition took place in the Sabre, Foil, and Épée. Team competition also took place. All competition took place at Al-Arabi Indoor Hall.

== Schedule ==
P	Pools	F	Finals

Event↓/Date →	9th Sat		10th Sun		11th Mon		12th Tue	13th Wed	14th Thu
Men's individual épée					P	F			
Men's team épée									F
Men's individual foil	P	F							
Men's team foil							F		
Men's individual sabre			P	F					
Men's team sabre								F	
Women's individual épée			P	F					
Women's team épée								F	
Women's individual foil					P	F			
Women's team foil									F
Women's individual sabre	P	F							
Women's team sabre							F		

== Medalists ==
=== Men ===
Event	Gold	Silver	Bronze
Individual épée	Wang Lei; China	Xie Yongjun; China	Ali Yaghoubian; Iran
Individual épée	Wang Lei; China	Xie Yongjun; China	Kim Seung-gu; South Korea
Team épée	South Korea; Jung Jin-sun; Kim Seung-gu; Kim Won-jin; Park Sang-sun	China; Dong Guotao; Wang Lei; Xiao Jian; Xie Yongjun	Iran; Siamak Feiz-Asgari; Mohammad Rezaei; Hamed Sedaghati; Ali Yaghoubian
Team épée	South Korea; Jung Jin-sun; Kim Seung-gu; Kim Won-jin; Park Sang-sun	China; Dong Guotao; Wang Lei; Xiao Jian; Xie Yongjun	Kazakhstan; Alexandr Axenov; Sergey Khodos; Sergey Shabalin; Alexey Shipilov
Individual foil	Yuki Ota; Japan	Lee Cheon-woong; South Korea	Zhang Liangliang; China
Individual foil	Yuki Ota; Japan	Lee Cheon-woong; South Korea	Lei Sheng; China
Team foil	China; Lei Sheng; Wu Hanxiong; Zhang Liangliang; Zhu Jun	South Korea; Cha Hyung-woo; Choi Byung-chul; Ha Chang-duk; Lee Cheon-woong	Hong Kong; Cheung Kai Tung; Lau Kwok Kin; Kevin Ngan; Wong Kam Kau
Team foil	China; Lei Sheng; Wu Hanxiong; Zhang Liangliang; Zhu Jun	South Korea; Cha Hyung-woo; Choi Byung-chul; Ha Chang-duk; Lee Cheon-woong	Japan; Kenta Chida; Yusuke Fukuda; Yuki Ota
Individual sabre	Wang Jingzhi; China	Oh Eun-seok; South Korea	Wiradech Kothny; Thailand
Individual sabre	Wang Jingzhi; China	Oh Eun-seok; South Korea	Zhou Hanming; China
Team sabre	China; Huang Yaojiang; Wang Jingzhi; Zhou Hanming; Zhu Jun	South Korea; Lee Hyuk; Oh Eun-seok; Oh Seung-hwan; Won Woo-young	Thailand; Natee Kattancharoen; Ekkathet Ketiam; Wiradech Kothny; Sares Limkangwanmongkol
Team sabre	China; Huang Yaojiang; Wang Jingzhi; Zhou Hanming; Zhu Jun	South Korea; Lee Hyuk; Oh Eun-seok; Oh Seung-hwan; Won Woo-young	Japan; Masashi Nagara; Tatsuro Watanabe; Koji Yamamoto

=== Women ===
Event	Gold	Silver	Bronze
Individual épée	Park Se-ra; South Korea	Zhong Weiping; China	Li Na; China
Individual épée	Park Se-ra; South Korea	Zhong Weiping; China	Shin A-lam; South Korea
Team épée	China; Li Na; Luo Xiaojuan; Zhang Li; Zhong Weiping	South Korea; Choi Eun-sook; Jung Hyo-jung; Park Se-ra; Shin A-lam	Japan; Shizuka Ikehata; Hiroko Narita; Yoshie Takeyama
Team épée	China; Li Na; Luo Xiaojuan; Zhang Li; Zhong Weiping	South Korea; Choi Eun-sook; Jung Hyo-jung; Park Se-ra; Shin A-lam	Hong Kong; Bjork Cheng; Cheung Yi Nei; Sabrina Lui; Yeung Chui Ling
Individual foil	Nam Hyun-hee; South Korea	Seo Mi-jung; South Korea	Yoko Makishita; Japan
Individual foil	Nam Hyun-hee; South Korea	Seo Mi-jung; South Korea	Chen Jinyan; China
Team foil	South Korea; Jeon Hee-sook; Jung Gil-ok; Nam Hyun-hee; Seo Mi-jung	China; Chen Jinyan; Huang Jialing; Su Wanwen; Zhang Ying	Kazakhstan; Olga Antipova; Irina Fichshenko; Natalya Kazantseva; Yelena Kazantseva
Team foil	South Korea; Jeon Hee-sook; Jung Gil-ok; Nam Hyun-hee; Seo Mi-jung	China; Chen Jinyan; Huang Jialing; Su Wanwen; Zhang Ying	Japan; Maki Kawanishi; Yoko Makishita; Chieko Sugawara
Individual sabre	Tan Xue; China	Zhao Yuanyuan; China	Kim Keum-hwa; South Korea
Individual sabre	Tan Xue; China	Zhao Yuanyuan; China	Chow Tsz Ki; Hong Kong
Team sabre	China; Huang Haiyang; Tan Xue; Zhang Ying; Zhao Yuanyuan	South Korea; Jang Hyun-kyung; Kim Hye-lim; Kim Keum-hwa; Lee Shin-mi	Japan; Madoka Hisagae; Sakura Kaneko; Haruko Nakamura
Team sabre	China; Huang Haiyang; Tan Xue; Zhang Ying; Zhao Yuanyuan	South Korea; Jang Hyun-kyung; Kim Hye-lim; Kim Keum-hwa; Lee Shin-mi	Hong Kong; Au Yeung Wai Sum; Chow Tsz Ki; Akina Pau; Tsui Wan Yi

== Medal table ==
Rank	Nation	Gold	Silver	Bronze	Total
1	China (CHN)	7	5	5	17
2	South Korea (KOR)	4	7	3	14
3	Japan (JPN)	1	0	6	7
4	Hong Kong (HKG)	0	0	4	4
5	Iran (IRI)	0	0	2	2
5	Kazakhstan (KAZ)	0	0	2	2
5	Thailand (THA)	0	0	2	2
Totals (7 entries)		12	12	24	48

== Participating nations ==
A total of 222 athletes from 21 nations competed in fencing at the 2006 Asian Games:

- Afghanistan (1)
- Bahrain (4)
- China (22)
- Chinese Taipei (4)
- Hong Kong (15)
- India (4)
- Iran (10)
- Iraq (4)
- Japan (16)
- Kazakhstan (16)
- Kuwait (22)
- Kyrgyzstan (7)
- Lebanon (4)
- Macau (8)
- Philippines (12)
- Qatar (20)
- Singapore (4)
- South Korea (24)
- Thailand (9)
- Uzbekistan (5)
- Vietnam (11)
