= Fencing at the 2002 Asian Games – Men's team épée =

Men's team épée at the 2002 Asian Games
- Venue: Gangseo Gymnasium
- Date: 2 October 2002
- Competitors: 45 from 12 nations

Medalists
gold medal	Kazakhstan; Alexandr Axenov, Dmitriy Dimov, Sergey Shabalin, Alexey Shipilov
silver medal	China; Wang Lei, Xie Yongjun, Zhao Chunsheng, Zhao Gang
bronze medal	South Korea; Kim Jung-kwan, Ku Kyo-dong, Lee Sang-yup, Yang Roy-sung

The men's team épée competition at the 2002 Asian Games in Busan, South Korea was held on 2 October 2002 at the Gangseo Gymnasium.

The first seed Kazakhstan (Alexandr Axenov, Dmitriy Dimov, Sergey Shabalin and Alexey Shipilov) won the gold medal after beating China (Wang Lei, Xie Younjun, Zhao Chunsheng and Zhao Gang) in final in extra time 31–30. The host team South Korea (Kim Jung-kwan, Ku Kyo-dong, Lee Sang-yup and Yang Roy-sung) won the bronze medal, the Korean team managed to beat Kuwait in the bronze medal match 45–19.

== Schedule ==
All times are Korea Standard Time (UTC+09:00)

Date	Time	Event
Wednesday, 2 October 2002	13:00	1/8 elimination
Wednesday, 2 October 2002	13:00	Quarterfinals
Wednesday, 2 October 2002	13:00	Semifinals
Wednesday, 2 October 2002	13:00	Classification
Wednesday, 2 October 2002	19:30	Finals

== Results ==
1/8 elimination
9	Qatar	24
8	Kyrgyzstan	45
5	Uzbekistan	45
12	Philippines	35
11	Turkmenistan	41
6	Kuwait	45
7	Saudi Arabia	45
10	Macau	24

Quarterfinals
1	Kazakhstan	45
8	Kyrgyzstan	28
5	Uzbekistan	30
4	South Korea	45
3	Japan	36
6	Kuwait	43
7	Saudi Arabia	30
2	China	45

Semifinals
1	Kazakhstan	44
4	South Korea	43
6	Kuwait	18
2	China	45

Final
1	Kazakhstan	31
2	China	30
3rd–4th place
4	South Korea	45
6	Kuwait	19

5th~8th place
8	Kyrgyzstan	31
5	Uzbekistan	45
3	Japan	45
7	Saudi Arabia	39

5th–6th place
5	Uzbekistan	45
3	Japan	28
7th–8th place
8	Kyrgyzstan	45
7	Saudi Arabia	37

9th~12th place
9	Qatar	33
12	Philippines	45
11	Turkmenistan	45
10	Macau	38

9th–10th place
12	Philippines	45
11	Turkmenistan	26
11th–12th place
9	Qatar	39
10	Macau	45

== Final standing ==
Rank	Team
1st place, gold medalist(s)	Kazakhstan (KAZ); Alexandr Axenov; Dmitriy Dimov; Sergey Shabalin; Alexey Shipilov
2nd place, silver medalist(s)	China (CHN); Wang Lei; Xie Yongjun; Zhao Chunsheng; Zhao Gang
3rd place, bronze medalist(s)	South Korea (KOR); Kim Jung-kwan; Ku Kyo-dong; Lee Sang-yup; Yang Roy-sung
4	Kuwait (KUW); Mohammad Al-Ajmi; Hamad Al-Awadhi; Qaisar Al-Zamel; Hasan Malallah
5	Uzbekistan (UZB); Roman Bobrushko; Ruslan Kudayev; Shovkat Turdiqulov
6	Japan (JPN); Kenji Kawamura; Akihisa Mochida; Naoto Okazaki; Kenji Ota
7	Kyrgyzstan (KGZ); Evgeniy Chigrin; Andrey Hanadeyev; Mirsait Mirdjaliev; Pavel Uvarov
8	Saudi Arabia (KSA); Islam Al-Abdulmohsen; Nawaf Al-Azwari; Mohammed Al-Jaizani; Majid Al-Thobity
9	Philippines (PHI); Armando Bernal; Richard Gomez; Walbert Mendoza; Avelino Victorino
10	Turkmenistan (TKM); Döwlet Balaýew; Nurnepes Öwezow; Aleksandr Peregudow
11	Macau (MAC); Hoi Kio Heng; Sam Wai Hong; Wong Soi Cheong
12	Qatar (QAT); Yahia Ahmed; Mohammed Al-Dossary; Fahad Al-Yami; Khalid Johar
