= Fencing at the 2006 Asian Games – Men's team épée =

Men's team épée at the 2006 Asian Games
- Venue: Al-Arabi Indoor Hall
- Date: 14 December 2006
- Competitors: 46 from 12 nations

Medalists
gold medal	South Korea; Jung Jin-sun, Kim Seung-gu, Kim Won-jin, Park Sang-sun
silver medal	China; Dong Guotao, Wang Lei, Xiao Jian, Xie Yongjun
bronze medal	Iran; Siamak Feiz-Asgari, Mohammad Rezaei, Hamed Sedaghati, Ali Yaghoubian
bronze medal	Kazakhstan; Alexandr Axenov, Sergey Khodos, Sergey Shabalin, Alexey Shipilov

The men's team épée competition at the 2006 Asian Games in Doha was held on 14 December at the Al-Arabi Indoor Hall.

== Schedule ==
All times are Arabia Standard Time (UTC+03:00)

Date	Time	Event
Thursday, 14 December 2006	13:05	Round of 16
Thursday, 14 December 2006	14:30	Quarterfinals
Thursday, 14 December 2006	15:55	Semifinals
Thursday, 14 December 2006	19:20	Gold medal match

== Seeding ==
The teams were seeded taking into account the results achieved by competitors representing each team in the individual event.

Rank	Team	Fencer		Total
Rank	Team	1	2	Total
1	China (CHN)	1	2	3
2	South Korea (KOR)	3	6	9
3	Kazakhstan (KAZ)	7	8	15
4	Iran (IRI)	3	13	16
5	Kyrgyzstan (KGZ)	11	14	25
6	Philippines (PHI)	10	19	29
7	Uzbekistan (UZB)	9	21	30
8	Qatar (QAT)	12	20	32
9	Kuwait (KUW)	16	17	33
10	Lebanon (LIB)	15	22	37
11	Bahrain (BRN)	18	25	43
12	Iraq (IRQ)	24	26	50

== Results ==
Round of 16
9	Kuwait	45
8	Qatar	33
5	Kyrgyzstan	45
12	Iraq	38
11	Bahrain	31
6	Philippines	45
7	Uzbekistan	45
10	Lebanon	39

Quarterfinals
1	China	45
9	Kuwait	24
5	Kyrgyzstan	31
4	Iran	45
3	Kazakhstan	45
6	Philippines	24
7	Uzbekistan	21
2	South Korea	45

Semifinals
1	China	45
4	Iran	24
3	Kazakhstan	33
2	South Korea	45

Gold medal match
1	China	33
2	South Korea	35

== Final standing ==
Rank	Team
1st place, gold medalist(s)	South Korea (KOR); Jung Jin-sun; Kim Seung-gu; Kim Won-jin; Park Sang-sun
2nd place, silver medalist(s)	China (CHN); Dong Guotao; Wang Lei; Xiao Jian; Xie Yongjun
3rd place, bronze medalist(s)	Iran (IRI); Siamak Feiz-Asgari; Mohammad Rezaei; Hamed Sedaghati; Ali Yaghoubian
3rd place, bronze medalist(s)	Kazakhstan (KAZ); Alexandr Axenov; Sergey Khodos; Sergey Shabalin; Alexey Shipilov
5	Kyrgyzstan (KGZ); Konstantin Altsev; Andrei Khrebtov; Mirsait Mirdjaliev; Aleksandr Poddubny
6	Philippines (PHI); Avelino Victorino; Almario Vizcayno; Wilfredo Vizcayno
7	Uzbekistan (UZB); Roman Aleksandrov; Alexandr Filinov; Ruslan Kudayev
8	Kuwait (KUW); Hamad Al-Awadhi; Ahmad Al-Khedhir; Khaled Al-Shammari; Hasan Malallah
9	Qatar (QAT); Mohammed Al-Dossary; Adel Al-Jailani; Fahad Al-Yami; Abdullah Jamaan
10	Lebanon (LIB); Chafic El-Khoury; Georges Fayad; Victor Fayad; Fady Tannous
11	Bahrain (BRN); Ahmed Al-Doseri; Salman Yusuf Ali; Salah Busafar; Abdulrahman Khaled
12	Iraq (IRQ); Ahmed Kadhim; Haidar Mohammed; Ali Salih; Saad Salih
