= Fencing at the 2006 Asian Games – Women's team sabre =

Women's team sabre at the 2006 Asian Games
- Venue: Al-Arabi Indoor Hall
- Date: 12 December 2006
- Competitors: 19 from 5 nations

Medalists
gold medal	China; Huang Haiyang, Tan Xue, Zhang Ying, Zhao Yuanyuan
silver medal	South Korea; Jang Hyun-kyung, Kim Hye-lim, Kim Keum-hwa, Lee Shin-mi
bronze medal	Japan; Madoka Hisagae, Sakura Kaneko, Haruko Nakamura
bronze medal	Hong Kong; Au Yeung Wai Sum, Chow Tsz Ki, Akina Pau, Tsui Wan Yi

The women's team sabre competition at the 2006 Asian Games in Doha was held on 12 December at the Al-Arabi Indoor Hall.

== Schedule ==
All times are Arabia Standard Time (UTC+03:00)

Date	Time	Event
Tuesday, 12 December 2006	09:00	Quarterfinals
Tuesday, 12 December 2006	10:00	Semifinals
Tuesday, 12 December 2006	18:00	Gold medal match

== Seeding ==
The teams were seeded taking into account the results achieved by competitors representing each team in the individual event.

Rank	Team	Fencer		Total
Rank	Team	1	2	Total
1	China (CHN)	1	2	3
2	South Korea (KOR)	3	6	9
3	Hong Kong (HKG)	3	8	11
4	Japan (JPN)	5	7	12
5	Vietnam (VIE)	9	10	19

== Results ==
Quarterfinals			Semifinals			Gold medal match
			1	China	45
5	Vietnam	33	4	Japan	40
4	Japan	45				1	China	45
						2	South Korea	38
			3	Hong Kong	34
			2	South Korea	45

== Final standing ==
Rank	Team
1st place, gold medalist(s)	China (CHN); Huang Haiyang; Tan Xue; Zhang Ying; Zhao Yuanyuan
2nd place, silver medalist(s)	South Korea (KOR); Jang Hyun-kyung; Kim Hye-lim; Kim Keum-hwa; Lee Shin-mi
3rd place, bronze medalist(s)	Japan (JPN); Madoka Hisagae; Sakura Kaneko; Haruko Nakamura
3rd place, bronze medalist(s)	Hong Kong (HKG); Au Yeung Wai Sum; Chow Tsz Ki; Akina Pau; Tsui Wan Yi
5	Vietnam (VIE); Nguyễn Thị Hoài Thu; Nguyễn Thị Lệ Dung; Nguyễn Thị Thủy Chung; Trịnh Thị Lý
