= Fencing at the 2002 Asian Games – Women's team sabre =

Women's team sabre at the 2002 Asian Games
- Venue: Gangseo Gymnasium
- Date: 3 October 2002
- Competitors: 16 from 4 nations

Medalists
| gold medal | China; Bao Yingying, Huang Haiyang, Tan Xue, Zhang Ying |
| silver medal | South Korea; Cho Kyung-mi, Kim Hee-yeon, Lee Gyu-young, Lee Shin-mi |
| bronze medal | Japan; Madoka Hisagae, Miyuki Kano, Chiyo Ogawa, Chieko Sugawara |

The women's team sabre competition at the 2002 Asian Games in Busan, South Korea was held on 3 October 2002 at the Gangseo Gymnasium.

== Schedule ==
All times are Korea Standard Time (UTC+09:00)

| Date | Time | Event |
|---|---|---|
| Thursday, 3 October 2002 | 10:00 | Semifinals |
| Thursday, 3 October 2002 | 16:50 | Finals |

== Results ==
Semifinals
1 | China | 45
4 | Hong Kong | 33
3 | Japan | 43
2 | South Korea | 45

Final
1 | China | 45
2 | South Korea | 37
3rd–4th place
4 | Hong Kong | 42
3 | Japan | 45

== Final standing ==
| Rank | Team |
|---|---|
| 1st place, gold medalist(s) | China (CHN); Bao Yingying; Huang Haiyang; Tan Xue; Zhang Ying |
| 2nd place, silver medalist(s) | South Korea (KOR); Cho Kyung-mi; Kim Hee-yeon; Lee Gyu-young; Lee Shin-mi |
| 3rd place, bronze medalist(s) | Japan (JPN); Madoka Hisagae; Miyuki Kano; Chiyo Ogawa; Chieko Sugawara |
| 4 | Hong Kong (HKG); Au Yeung Wai Sum; Chow Tsz Ki; Akina Pau; Tsui Wan Yi |
