= Fencing at the 2002 Asian Games – Men's team foil =

Men's team foil at the 2002 Asian Games
- Venue: Gangseo Gymnasium
- Date: 2 October 2002
- Competitors: 24 from 6 nations

Medalists
gold medal	China; Wang Haibin, Wu Hanxiong, Zhang Jie, Zhou Rui
silver medal	South Korea; Choi Byung-chul, Kim Sang-hun, Kim Young-ho, Lee Kwan-haeng
bronze medal	Japan; Yusuke Fukuda, Takashi Okano, Naoto Okazaki, Hayato Shibuki

The men's team foil competition at the 2002 Asian Games in Busan, South Korea was held on 2 October 2002 at the Gangseo Gymnasium.

== Schedule ==
All times are Korea Standard Time (UTC+09:00)

Date	Time	Event
Wednesday, 2 October 2002	13:00	Quarterfinals
Wednesday, 2 October 2002	13:00	Semifinals
Wednesday, 2 October 2002	13:00	Classification
Wednesday, 2 October 2002	18:00	Finals

== Results ==
Quarterfinals
5	Japan	45
4	Kuwait	37
3	Hong Kong	45
6	Philippines	28

Semifinals
1	South Korea	45
5	Japan	40
3	Hong Kong	24
2	China	45

Final
1	South Korea	38
2	China	45
3rd–4th place
5	Japan	45
3	Hong Kong	23

5th–6th place
4	Kuwait	45
6	Philippines	28

== Final standing ==
Rank	Team
1st place, gold medalist(s)	China (CHN); Wang Haibin; Wu Hanxiong; Zhang Jie; Zhou Rui
2nd place, silver medalist(s)	South Korea (KOR); Choi Byung-chul; Kim Sang-hun; Kim Young-ho; Lee Kwan-haeng
3rd place, bronze medalist(s)	Japan (JPN); Yusuke Fukuda; Takashi Okano; Naoto Okazaki; Hayato Shibuki
4	Hong Kong (HKG); Fong Siu Yan; Lau Kwok Kin; Tom Tse; Wong Kam Kau
5	Kuwait (KUW); Othman Al-Shammari; Saoud Al-Zamel; Wael Husain; Abdulmohsen Shahrayen
6	Philippines (PHI); Rolando Canlas; Ramil Endriano; Walbert Mendoza; Emerson Segui
