= Fencing at the 2002 Asian Games – Women's team foil =

Women's team foil at the 2002 Asian Games
- Venue: Gangseo Gymnasium
- Date: 3 October 2002
- Competitors: 12 from 3 nations

Medalists
gold medal	South Korea; Lim Mi-kyung, Nam Hyun-hee, Oh Tae-young, Seo Mi-jung
silver medal	China; Liu Yuan, Ma Na, Meng Jie, Zhang Lei
bronze medal	Japan; Yuko Arai, Madoka Hisagae, Chieko Sugawara, Mika Uchiyama

The women's team foil competition at the 2002 Asian Games in Busan, South Korea was held on 3 October 2002 at the Gangseo Gymnasium.

== Schedule ==
All times are Korea Standard Time (UTC+09:00)

Date	Time	Event
Thursday, 3 October 2002	10:00	Semifinals
Thursday, 3 October 2002	18:00	Finals

== Results ==
Semifinals			Final
			1	China	32
3	Japan	30	2	South Korea	45
2	South Korea	38

== Final standing ==
Rank	Team
1st place, gold medalist(s)	South Korea (KOR); Lim Mi-kyung; Nam Hyun-hee; Oh Tae-young; Seo Mi-jung
2nd place, silver medalist(s)	China (CHN); Liu Yuan; Ma Na; Meng Jie; Zhang Lei
3rd place, bronze medalist(s)	Japan (JPN); Yuko Arai; Madoka Hisagae; Chieko Sugawara; Mika Uchiyama
