= Fencing at the 1998 Asian Games – Men's individual épée =

Men's individual épée at the 1998 Asian Games
- Venue: Thammasat Gymnasium 4
- Date: 12 December 1998
- Competitors: 27 from 9 nations

Medalists
gold medal	Yang Roy-sung	South Korea
silver medal	Lee Sang-ki	South Korea
bronze medal	Zhao Gang	China

The men's individual épée competition at the 1998 Asian Games in Bangkok was held on 12 December 1998 at the Thammasat Gymnasium 4.

== Schedule ==
All times are Indochina Time (UTC+07:00)

Date	Time	Event
Saturday, 12 December 1998	09:00	Preliminaries
Saturday, 12 December 1998	16:00	Finals

== Results ==
=== Round of pools ===
==== Pool A ====
Athlete	THA	KAZ	IRI	PHI	KOR	JPN	CHN
Trai Boodratana (THA)	—	3–5	2–5	3–5	1–5	4–5	2–5
Dmitriy Dimov (KAZ)	5–3	—	3–5	5–4	5–2	5–3	3–5
Siamak Feiz-Asgari (IRI)	5–2	5–3	—	5–4	3–5	2–5	4–5
Richard Gomez (PHI)	5–3	4–5	4–5	—	3–5	5–4	3–5
Lee Sang-ki (KOR)	5–1	2–5	5–3	5–3	—	5–2	5–3
Shuji Takiguchi (JPN)	5–4	3–5	5–2	4–5	2–5	—	0–5
Wang Qibing (CHN)	5–2	5–3	5–4	5–3	3–5	5–0	—

Legend: Blue = left column team win; Red = top row team win.

==== Pool B ====
Athlete	KUW	JPN	KGZ	IRI	THA	CHN
Hasan Malallah (KUW)	—	4–5	3–5	5–3	4–5	4–5
Shinri Kato (JPN)	5–4	—	5–3	5–4	5–2	0–5
Aleksandr Poddubny (KGZ)	5–3	3–5	—	5–1	5–4	5–0
Ghodratollah Rezaei (IRI)	3–5	4–5	1–5	—	2–5	3–5
Siriroj Rathprasert (THA)	5–4	2–5	4–5	5–2	—	2–5
Zhao Gang (CHN)	5–4	5–0	0–5	5–3	5–2	—

Legend: Blue = left column team win; Red = top row team win.

==== Pool C ====
Athlete	KUW	IRI	PHI	KAZ	KGZ	CHN	KOR
Qaisar Al-Zamel (KUW)	—	2–5	3–5	0–5	1–5	1–5	1–5
Farhad Rezaei (IRI)	5–2	—	5–4	5–3	4–5	4–5	1–5
Emerson Segui (PHI)	5–3	4–5	—	1–5	2–5	4–5	5–3
Sergey Shabalin (KAZ)	5–0	3–5	5–1	—	5–4	5–3	1–5
Aleksandr Smerdin (KGZ)	5–1	5–4	5–2	4–5	—	2–5	1–5
Xiao Jian (CHN)	5–1	5–4	5–4	3–5	5–2	—	2–5
Yang Roy-sung (KOR)	5–1	5–1	3–5	5–1	5–1	5–2	—

Legend: Blue = left column team win; Red = top row team win.

==== Pool D ====
Athlete	PHI	KGZ	KUW	JPN	KOR	KAZ	THA
Armando Bernal (PHI)	—	4–5	3–5	5–1	0–5	2–5	3–5
Evgeniy Chigrin (KGZ)	5–4	—	3–5	5–4	4–5	2–5	5–0
Ali Malallah (KUW)	5–3	5–3	—	1–5	4–5	5–3	1–5
Hiroki Ichigatani (JPN)	1–5	4–5	5–1	—	2–5	3–5	4–5
Lee Sang-yup (KOR)	5–0	5–4	5–4	5–2	—	5–3	5–0
Alexey Pistsov (KAZ)	5–2	5–2	3–5	5–3	3–5	—	4–5
Amornratch Tonboon (THA)	5–3	0–5	5–1	5–4	0–5	5–4	—

Legend: Blue = left column team win; Red = top row team win.

==== Summary ====
Rank	Pool	Athlete	W	L	W/M	TD	TF
1	D	Lee Sang-yup (KOR)	6	0	1.000	+17	30
2	C	Yang Roy-sung (KOR)	5	1	0.833	+17	28
3	A	Wang Qibing (CHN)	5	1	0.833	+11	28
4	A	Lee Sang-ki (KOR)	5	1	0.833	+10	27
5	B	Aleksandr Poddubny (KGZ)	4	1	0.800	+10	23
6	B	Zhao Gang (CHN)	4	1	0.800	+6	20
7	B	Shinri Kato (JPN)	4	1	0.800	+2	20
8	C	Sergey Shabalin (KAZ)	4	2	0.667	+6	24
9	A	Dmitriy Dimov (KAZ)	4	2	0.667	+4	26
10	C	Xiao Jian (CHN)	4	2	0.667	+4	25
11	D	Amornratch Tonboon (THA)	4	2	0.667	−2	20
12	D	Alexey Pistsov (KAZ)	3	3	0.500	+3	25
13	D	Evgeniy Chigrin (KGZ)	3	3	0.500	+1	24
14	A	Siamak Feiz-Asgari (IRI)	3	3	0.500	0	24
14	C	Farhad Rezaei (IRI)	3	3	0.500	0	24
16	C	Aleksandr Smerdin (KGZ)	3	3	0.500	0	22
17	D	Ali Malallah (KUW)	3	3	0.500	−3	21
18	B	Siriroj Rathprasert (THA)	2	3	0.400	−3	18
19	A	Richard Gomez (PHI)	2	4	0.333	−3	24
20	C	Emerson Segui (PHI)	2	4	0.333	−5	21
21	A	Shuji Takiguchi (JPN)	2	4	0.333	−7	19
22	B	Hasan Malallah (KUW)	1	4	0.200	−3	20
23	D	Hiroki Ichigatani (JPN)	1	5	0.167	−7	19
24	D	Armando Bernal (PHI)	1	5	0.167	−9	17
25	B	Ghodratollah Rezaei (IRI)	0	5	0.000	−12	13
26	A	Trai Boodratana (THA)	0	6	0.000	−15	15
27	C	Qaisar Al-Zamel (KUW)	0	6	0.000	−22	8

=== Knockout round ===
==== Finals ====
Final
4	Lee Sang-ki (KOR)	7
2	Yang Roy-sung (KOR)	15

Bronze medal match
1	Lee Sang-yup (KOR)	9
6	Zhao Gang (CHN)	13

==== Top half ====
Round of 32
17	Ali Malallah (KUW)	6
16	Aleksandr Smerdin (KGZ)	15
9	Dmitriy Dimov (KAZ)	15
24	Armando Bernal (PHI)	4
25	Ghodratollah Rezaei (IRI)	13
8	Sergey Shabalin (KAZ)	15
21	Shuji Takiguchi (JPN)	5
12	Alexey Pistsov (KAZ)	15
13	Evgeniy Chigrin (KGZ)	15
20	Emerson Segui (PHI)	8

Round of 16
1	Lee Sang-yup (KOR)	15
16	Aleksandr Smerdin (KGZ)	12
9	Dmitriy Dimov (KAZ)	15
8	Sergey Shabalin (KAZ)	9
5	Aleksandr Poddubny (KGZ)	11
12	Alexey Pistsov (KAZ)	15
13	Evgeniy Chigrin (KGZ)	14
4	Lee Sang-ki (KOR)	15

Quarterfinals
1	Lee Sang-yup (KOR)	15
9	Dmitriy Dimov (KAZ)	14
12	Alexey Pistsov (KAZ)	8
4	Lee Sang-ki (KOR)	15

Semifinals
1	Lee Sang-yup (KOR)	11
4	Lee Sang-ki (KOR)	15

==== Bottom half ====
Round of 32
19	Richard Gomez (PHI)	12
14	Siamak Feiz-Asgari (IRI)	15
11	Amornratch Tonboon (THA)	12
22	Hasan Malallah (KUW)	15
27	Qaisar Al-Zamel (KUW)	4
6	Zhao Gang (CHN)	15
7	Shinri Kato (JPN)	14
26	Trai Boodratana (THA)	15
23	Hiroki Ichigatani (JPN)	15
10	Xiao Jian (CHN)	11
15	Farhad Rezaei (IRI)	15
18	Siriroj Rathprasert (THA)	14

Round of 16
3	Wang Qibing (CHN)	15
14	Siamak Feiz-Asgari (IRI)	12
22	Hasan Malallah (KUW)	11
6	Zhao Gang (CHN)	15
26	Trai Boodratana (THA)	10
23	Hiroki Ichigatani (JPN)	15
15	Farhad Rezaei (IRI)	5
2	Yang Roy-sung (KOR)	15

Quarterfinals
3	Wang Qibing (CHN)	5
6	Zhao Gang (CHN)	15
23	Hiroki Ichigatani (JPN)	8
2	Yang Roy-sung (KOR)	15

Semifinals
6	Zhao Gang (CHN)	8
2	Yang Roy-sung (KOR)	15
