= Fencing at the 2006 Asian Games – Women's team foil =

Women's team foil at the 2006 Asian Games
- Venue: Al-Arabi Indoor Hall
- Date: 14 December 2006
- Competitors: 34 from 9 nations

Medalists
gold medal	South Korea; Jeon Hee-sook, Jung Gil-ok, Nam Hyun-hee, Seo Mi-jung
silver medal	China; Chen Jinyan, Huang Jialing, Su Wanwen, Zhang Ying
bronze medal	Kazakhstan; Olga Antipova, Irina Fichshenko, Natalya Kazantseva; Yelena Kazantseva
bronze medal	Japan; Maki Kawanishi, Yoko Makishita, Chieko Sugawara

The women's team foil competition at the 2006 Asian Games in Doha was held on 14 December at the Al-Arabi Indoor Hall.

== Schedule ==
All times are Arabia Standard Time (UTC+03:00)

Date	Time	Event
Thursday, 14 December 2006	09:00	Round of 16
Thursday, 14 December 2006	10:25	Quarterfinals
Thursday, 14 December 2006	11:50	Semifinals
Thursday, 14 December 2006	18:00	Gold medal match

== Seeding ==
The teams were seeded taking into account the results achieved by competitors representing each team in the individual event.

Rank	Team	Fencer		Total
Rank	Team	1	2	Total
1	South Korea (KOR)	1	2	3
2	Japan (JPN)	3	5	8
3	China (CHN)	3	7	10
4	Kazakhstan (KAZ)	6	10	16
5	Singapore (SIN)	8	14	22
6	Vietnam (VIE)	12	19	31
7	Macau (MAC)	16	17	33
8	Qatar (QAT)	15	20	35
9	Kuwait (KUW)	18	21	39

== Results ==
Round of 16
9	Kuwait	25
8	Qatar	35

Quarterfinals
1	South Korea	45
8	Qatar	6
5	Singapore	34
4	Kazakhstan	45
3	China	45
6	Vietnam	25
7	Macau	13
2	Japan	45

Semifinals
1	South Korea	45
4	Kazakhstan	20
3	China	37
2	Japan	29

Gold medal match
1	South Korea	45
3	China	37

== Final standing ==
Rank	Team
1st place, gold medalist(s)	South Korea (KOR); Jeon Hee-sook; Jung Gil-ok; Nam Hyun-hee; Seo Mi-jung
2nd place, silver medalist(s)	China (CHN); Chen Jinyan; Huang Jialing; Su Wanwen; Zhang Ying
3rd place, bronze medalist(s)	Kazakhstan (KAZ); Olga Antipova; Irina Fichshenko; Natalya Kazantseva; Yelena Kazantseva
3rd place, bronze medalist(s)	Japan (JPN); Maki Kawanishi; Yoko Makishita; Chieko Sugawara
5	Singapore (SIN); Ruth Ng; Serene Ser; Tay Yu Ling; Wang Wenying
6	Vietnam (VIE); Lê Thị Bích; Nguyễn Thị Hoài Thu; Nguyễn Thị Nguyệt; Nguyễn Thị Tươi
7	Macau (MAC); Chek Soi Lin; Ng In Leng; U Nga Fong
8	Qatar (QAT); Maryam Al-Khelaifi; Noora Al-Kuwari; Ghareeba Hammad; Afraa Jumah
9	Kuwait (KUW); Ameinah Al-Ali; Thraia Al-Shaikh; Hala Al-Shamari; Jamilah Sawedan
