= Fencing at the 2002 Asian Games – Men's individual épée =

Men's individual épée at the 2002 Asian Games
- Venue: Gangseo Gymnasium
- Date: 29 September 2002
- Competitors: 27 from 15 nations

Medalists
gold medal	Zhao Gang	China
silver medal	Wang Lei	China
bronze medal	Sergey Shabalin	Kazakhstan

The men's individual épée competition at the 2002 Asian Games in Busan was held on 29 September at the Gangseo Gymnasium.

== Schedule ==
All times are Korea Standard Time (UTC+09:00)

Date	Time	Event
Sunday, 29 September 2002	10:00	Preliminary pool
Sunday, 29 September 2002	13:00	1/16 elimination
Sunday, 29 September 2002	13:00	1/8 elimination
Sunday, 29 September 2002	13:00	Quarterfinals
Sunday, 29 September 2002	13:00	Semifinals
Sunday, 29 September 2002	20:30	Finals

== Results ==
=== Preliminary pool ===
Rank	Pool	Athlete	W	L	W/M	TD	TF
1	3	Wang Lei (CHN)	4	0	1.000	+15	20
2	4	Zhao Gang (CHN)	4	0	1.000	+10	20
3	2	Lee Sang-yup (KOR)	4	1	0.800	+11	24
4	1	Ruslan Kudayev (UZB)	4	1	0.800	+8	23
5	2	Sergey Shabalin (KAZ)	4	1	0.800	+8	20
6	1	Akihisa Mochida (JPN)	4	1	0.800	+8	20
7	4	Kenji Ota (JPN)	3	1	0.750	+5	21
8	5	Hamad Al-Awadhi (KUW)	3	1	0.750	+2	17
9	3	Nicola Lu (HKG)	3	1	0.750	+2	16
10	1	Mirsait Mirdjaliev (KGZ)	3	2	0.600	+10	22
11	1	Dmitriy Dimov (KAZ)	3	2	0.600	+6	19
12	2	Hasan Malallah (KUW)	3	2	0.600	+5	20
13	2	Roman Bobrushko (UZB)	3	2	0.600	−2	19
14	5	Ku Kyo-dong (KOR)	2	2	0.500	+3	18
15	5	Evgeniy Chigrin (KGZ)	2	2	0.500	+3	17
16	4	Majid Al-Thobity (KSA)	2	2	0.500	+2	17
17	5	Nawaf Al-Azwari (KSA)	2	2	0.500	−1	14
18	3	Avelino Victorino (PHI)	1	3	0.250	−5	12
19	4	Aleksandr Peregudow (TKM)	1	3	0.250	−6	12
20	3	Hoi Kio Heng (MAC)	1	3	0.250	−6	11
21	3	Victor Fayad (LIB)	1	3	0.250	−6	10
22	5	Nurnepes Öwezow (TKM)	1	3	0.250	−7	11
23	2	Mohammed Al-Dossary (QAT)	1	4	0.200	−7	14
24	1	Richard Gomez (PHI)	1	4	0.200	−9	13
25	2	Sam Wai Hong (MAC)	0	5	0.000	−15	10
26	4	Fady Rumman (PLE)	0	4	0.000	−15	5
27	1	Fahad Al-Yami (QAT)	0	5	0.000	−20	5

=== Knockout round ===
==== Finals ====
Final
1	Wang Lei (CHN)	12
2	Zhao Gang (CHN)	14

3rd–4th place
5	Sergey Shabalin (KAZ)	15
14	Ku Kyo-dong (KOR)	14

==== Top half ====
1/16 elimination
17	Nawaf Al-Azwari (KSA)	14
16	Majid Al-Thobity (KSA)	15
21	Victor Fayad (LIB)	15
12	Hssan Malallah (KUW)	14
13	Roman Bobrushko (UZB)	15
20	Hoi Kio Heng (MAC)	10

1/8 elimination
1	Wang Lei (CHN)	15
16	Majid Al-Thobity (KSA)	7
9	Nicola Lu (HKG)	11
8	Hamad Al-Awadhi (KUW)	15
5	Sergey Shabalin (KAZ)	15
21	Victor Fayad (LIB)	6
13	Roman Bobrushko (UZB)	13
4	Ruslan Kudayev (UZB)	15

Quarterfinals
1	Wang Lei (CHN)	15
8	Hamad Al-Awadhi (KUW)	12
5	Sergey Shabalin (KAZ)	10
4	Ruslan Kudayev (UZB)	9

Semifinals
1	Wang Lei (CHN)	15
5	Sergey Shabalin (KAZ)	7

==== Bottom half ====
1/16 elimination
19	Aleksandr Peregudow (TKM)	4
14	Ku Kyo-dong (KOR)	15
15	Evgeniy Chigrin (KGZ)	15
18	Avelino Victorino (PHI)	8

1/8 elimination
3	Lee Sang-yup (KOR)	12
14	Ku Kyo-dong (KOR)	15
11	Dmitriy Dimov (KAZ)	12
6	Akihisa Mochida (JPN)	15
7	Kenji Ota (JPN)	15
10	Mirsait Mirdjaliev (KGZ)	13
15	Evgeniy Chigrin (KGZ)	10
2	Zhao Gang (CHN)	15

Quarterfinals
14	Ku Kyo-dong (KOR)	15
6	Akihisa Mochida (JPN)	14
7	Kenji Ota (JPN)	12
2	Zhao Gang (CHN)	15

Semifinals
14	Ku Kyo-dong (KOR)	10
2	Zhao Gang (CHN)	15

== Final standing ==
Rank	Athlete
1st place, gold medalist(s)	Zhao Gang (CHN)
2nd place, silver medalist(s)	Wang Lei (CHN)
3rd place, bronze medalist(s)	Sergey Shabalin (KAZ)
4	Ku Kyo-dong (KOR)
5	Ruslan Kudayev (UZB)
6	Akihisa Mochida (JPN)
7	Kenji Ota (JPN)
8	Hamad Al-Awadhi (KUW)
9	Lee Sang-yup (KOR)
10	Nicola Lu (HKG)
11	Mirsait Mirdjaliev (KGZ)
12	Dmitriy Dimov (KAZ)
13	Roman Bobrushko (UZB)
14	Evgeniy Chigrin (KGZ)
15	Majid Al-Thobity (KSA)
16	Victor Fayad (LIB)
17	Hssan Malallah (KUW)
18	Nawaf Al-Azwari (KSA)
19	Avelino Victorino (PHI)
20	Aleksandr Peregudow (TKM)
21	Hoi Kio Heng (MAC)
22	Nurnepes Öwezow (TKM)
23	Mohammed Al-Dossary (QAT)
24	Richard Gomez (PHI)
25	Sam Wai Hong (MAC)
26	Fady Rumman (PLE)
27	Fahad Al-Yami (QAT)
