= Fencing at the 2002 Asian Games – Women's individual foil =

Women's individual foil at the 2002 Asian Games
- Venue: Gangseo Gymnasium
- Date: 30 September 2002
- Competitors: 9 from 6 nations

Medalists
gold medal	Zhang Lei	China
silver medal	Lim Mi-kyung	South Korea
bronze medal	Seo Mi-jung	South Korea

The women's individual foil competition at the 2002 Asian Games in Busan was held on 30 September at the Gangseo Gymnasium.

== Schedule ==
All times are Korea Standard Time (UTC+09:00)

Date	Time	Event
Monday, 30 September 2002	10:00	Preliminary pool
Monday, 30 September 2002	11:30	Quarterfinals
Monday, 30 September 2002	11:30	Semifinals
Monday, 30 September 2002	19:00	Finals

== Results ==
=== Preliminary pool ===
Rank	Pool	Athlete	W	L	W/M	TD	TF
1	1	Zhang Lei (CHN)	4	0	1.000	+16	19
2	2	Lim Mi-kyung (KOR)	3	0	1.000	+10	12
3	1	Yuko Arai (JPN)	3	1	0.750	+10	18
4	2	Chieko Sugawara (JPN)	2	1	0.667	+4	11
5	1	Seo Mi-jung (KOR)	2	2	0.500	+3	13
6	2	Meng Jie (CHN)	1	2	0.333	0	8
7	1	Aude El-Hawa (LIB)	1	3	0.250	−10	6
8	2	Chek Soi Lin (MAC)	0	3	0.000	−14	1
9	1	Wejdan Neimat (JOR)	0	4	0.000	−19	1

=== Knockout round ===
Quarterfinals
1	Zhang Lei (CHN)	15
8	Chek Soi Lin (MAC)	2
5	Seo Mi-jung (KOR)	9
4	Chieko Sugawara (JPN)	7
3	Yuko Arai (JPN)	8
6	Meng Jie (CHN)	15
7	Aude El-Hawa (LIB)	10
2	Lim Mi-kyung (KOR)	15

Semifinals
1	Zhang Lei (CHN)	9
5	Seo Mi-jung (KOR)	8
6	Meng Jie (CHN)	10
2	Lim Mi-kyung (KOR)	15

Final
1	Zhang Lei (CHN)	15
2	Lim Mi-kyung (KOR)	9
3rd–4th place
5	Seo Mi-jung (KOR)	15
6	Meng Jie (CHN)	13

== Final standing ==
Rank	Athlete
1st place, gold medalist(s)	Zhang Lei (CHN)
2nd place, silver medalist(s)	Lim Mi-kyung (KOR)
3rd place, bronze medalist(s)	Seo Mi-jung (KOR)
4	Meng Jie (CHN)
5	Yuko Arai (JPN)
6	Chieko Sugawara (JPN)
7	Aude El-Hawa (LIB)
8	Chek Soi Lin (MAC)
9	Wejdan Neimat (JOR)
