= Fencing at the Summer World University Games =

- Events: 12 (men: 6; women: 6)

Games
- 1959; 1960; 1961; 1962; 1963; 1964; 1965; 1966; 1967; 1968; 1970; 1970; 1973; 1972; 1975; 1975; 1977; 1978; 1979; 1981; 1983; 1985; 1987; 1989; 1991; 1993; 1995; 1997; 1999; 2001; 2003; 2005; 2007; 2009; 2011; 2013; 2015; 2017; 2019; 2021; 2025

Fencing events have been contested at every Universiade since the 1959 Summer Universiade in Turin, after not being included in 1975.

== Summary ==
Games	Year	Host city	Host country	Winner	Second	Third
I	1959	Turin	Italy	Italy	Hungary	France
II	1961	Sofia	Bulgaria	Hungary	Poland	West Germany
III	1963	Porto Alegre	Brazil	Hungary	Japan	France
IV	1965	Budapest	Hungary	Hungary	France	Romania
V	1967	Tokyo	Japan	Italy	Switzerland	France
VI	1970	Turin	Italy	Soviet Union	Hungary	West Germany
VII	1973	Moscow	Soviet Union	Soviet Union	Hungary	Romania
IX	1977	Sofia	Bulgaria	Soviet Union	Romania	France
X	1979	Mexico City	Mexico	Soviet Union	Hungary	East Germany
XI	1981	Bucharest	Romania	Italy	Soviet Union	Romania
XII	1983	Edmonton	Canada	Italy	Romania	Soviet Union
XIII	1985	Kobe	Japan	Soviet Union	Italy	Hungary
XIV	1987	Zagreb	Yugoslavia	Italy	Hungary	Cuba
XV	1989	Duisburg	West Germany	Italy	Hungary	Cuba
XVI	1991	Sheffield	Great Britain	Italy	Soviet Union	Germany
XVII	1993	Buffalo	United States	Italy	Hungary	Cuba
XVIII	1995	Fukuoka	Japan	Russia	Germany	Italy
XIX	1997	Messina	Italy	Ukraine	Hungary	Italy
XX	1999	Palma	Spain	Italy	Ukraine	Cuba
XXI	2001	Beijing	China	China	Russia	Italy
XXII	2003	Daegu	South Korea	China	South Korea	Russia
XXIII	2005	İzmir	Turkey	Russia	Italy	Ukraine
XXVIV	2007	Bangkok	Thailand	Ukraine	Russia	China
XXV	2009	Belgrade	Serbia	Italy	China	South Korea
XXVI	2011	Shenzhen	China	Ukraine	Russia	France
XXVII	2013	Kazan	Russia	Russia	South Korea	France
XXVIII	2015	Gwangju	South Korea	France	South Korea	Russia
XXIX	2017	Taipei	Taiwan	Hungary	Russia	Japan
XXX	2019	Naples	Italy	Italy	South Korea	France
XXXI	2021	Chengdu	China	France	China	Hong Kong
XXXIII	2025	Essen	Germany	South Korea	Italy	France

== Events ==
=== Men ===
Event	59	61	63	65	67	70	73	77	79	81	83	85	87	89	91	93	95	97	99	01	03	05	07	09	11	13	15	17	19	21	Years
Foil, individual	•	•	•	•	•	•	•	•	•	•	•	•	•	•	•	•	•	•	•	•	•	•	•	•	•	•	•	•	•	•	30
Sabre, individual	•	•	•	•	•	•	•	•	•	•	•	•	•	•	•	•	•	•	•	•	•	•	•	•	•	•	•	•	•	•	30
Épée, individual	•	•	•	•	•	•	•	•	•	•	•	•	•	•	•	•	•	•	•	•	•	•	•	•	•	•	•	•	•	•	30
Foil, team	•	•	•	•	•	•	•	•	•	•	•	•	•	•	•	•	•	•	•	•	•	•	•	•	•	•	•	•	•	•	30
Sabre, team	•	•	•	•	•	•	•	•	•	•	•	•	•	•	•	•	•	•	•	•	•	•	•	•	•	•	•	•	•	•	30
Épée, team	•	•	•	•	•	•	•	•	•	•	•	•	•	•	•	•	•	•	•	•	•	•	•	•	•	•	•	•	•	•	30

=== Women ===
Event	59	61	63	65	67	70	73	77	79	81	83	85	87	89	91	93	95	97	99	01	03	05	07	09	11	13	15	17	19	23	Years
Foil, individual	•	•	•	•	•	•	•	•	•	•	•	•	•	•	•	•	•	•	•	•	•	•	•	•	•	•	•	•	•	•	30
Épée, individual														•	•	•	•	•	•	•	•	•	•	•	•	•	•	•	•	•	17
Sabre, individual																				•	•	•	•	•	•	•	•	•	•	•	11
Foil, team	•	•	•	•		•	•	•	•	•	•	•	•	•	•	•	•	•	•	•	•	•	•	•	•	•	•	•	•	•	29
Épée, team														•	•	•	•	•	•	•	•	•	•	•	•	•	•	•	•	•	17
Sabre, team																				•	•	•	•	•	•	•	•	•	•	•	11

== Medal table ==
Last updated after the 2025 Summer World University Games

Rank	Nation	Gold	Silver	Bronze	Total
1	Italy (ITA)	52	55	67	174
2	Hungary (HUN)	45	38	27	110
3	Russia (RUS)	31	29	42	102
4	Soviet Union (URS)	30	31	21	82
5	France (FRA)	30	24	34	88
6	Ukraine (UKR)	23	18	18	59
7	China (CHN)	21	21	33	75
8	South Korea (KOR)	21	21	23	65
9	Cuba (CUB)	9	5	6	20
10	Romania (ROU)	8	13	11	32
11	Poland (POL)	7	15	30	52
12	Japan (JPN)	5	3	18	26
13	Germany (GER)	4	6	9	19
13	Switzerland (SUI)	4	6	9	19
15	Hong Kong (HKG)	4	0	3	7
16	West Germany (FRG)	3	5	9	17
17	Sweden (SWE)	2	1	2	5
18	Austria (AUT)	1	1	4	6
19	East Germany (GDR)	1	1	3	5
20	Estonia (EST)	1	0	5	6
21	Great Britain (GBR)	1	0	1	2
21	Individual Neutral Athletes (AIN)	1	0	1	2
23	Czech Republic (CZE)	1	0	0	1
23	Czechoslovakia (TCH)	1	0	0	1
25	United States (USA)	0	5	2	7
26	Spain (ESP)	0	1	4	5
27	Bulgaria (BUL)	0	1	3	4
27	Kazakhstan (KAZ)	0	1	3	4
29	Iran (IRI)	0	1	2	3
30	Belarus (BLR)	0	1	1	2
30	Canada (CAN)	0	1	1	2
30	Israel (ISR)	0	1	1	2
30	Turkey (TUR)	0	1	1	2
34	Netherlands (NED)	0	0	1	1
34	Uzbekistan (UZB)	0	0	1	1
Totals (35 entries)		306	306	396	1,008
