= Fencing at the 1998 Asian Games – Men's individual foil =

Men's individual foil at the 1998 Asian Games
- Venue: Thammasat Gymnasium 4
- Date: 10 December 1998
- Competitors: 27 from 9 nations

Medalists
gold medal	Wang Haibin	China
silver medal	Kim Young-ho	South Korea
bronze medal	You Bong-hyung	South Korea

The men's individual foil competition at the 1998 Asian Games in Bangkok was held on 10 December 1998 at the Thammasat Gymnasium 4.

== Schedule ==
All times are Indochina Time (UTC+07:00)

Date	Time	Event
Thursday, 10 December 1998	09:00	Preliminaries
Thursday, 10 December 1998	16:00	Finals

== Results ==
=== Round of pools ===
==== Pool A ====
Athlete	KUW	JPN	CHN	KAZ	HKG	THA	PHI
Othman Al-Shammari (KUW)	—	2–5	1–5	5–3	5–3	5–1	4–5
Yusuke Aoki (JPN)	5–2	—	5–4	3–5	5–2	5–1	5–1
Dong Zhaozhi (CHN)	5–1	4–5	—	5–3	5–1	5–1	5–1
Vyacheslav Grigoryev (KAZ)	3–5	5–3	3–5	—	5–4	5–0	5–1
Lau Kwok Kin (HKG)	3–5	2–5	1–5	4–5	—	5–1	5–1
Nikorn Papakdee (THA)	1–5	1–5	1–5	0–5	1–5	—	3–5
Ramon Portugal (PHI)	5–4	1–5	1–5	1–5	1–5	5–3	—

==== Pool B ====
Athlete	KAZ	IRI	CHN	KUW	THA	HKG	KOR
Nail Gubaidullin (KAZ)	—	2–5	1–5	3–5	5–0	5–2	2–5
Keivan Javanshir (IRI)	5–2	—	1–5	4–5	2–5	2–5	3–5
Lin Liang (CHN)	5–1	5–1	—	4–5	3–5	5–3	3–5
Salman Mohammad (KUW)	5–3	5–4	5–4	—	5–3	5–2	2–5
Preecha Tuntiruk (THA)	0–5	5–2	5–3	3–5	—	5–4	2–5
Wong Kam Kau (HKG)	2–5	5–2	3–5	2–5	4–5	—	2–5
You Bong-hyung (KOR)	5–2	5–3	5–3	5–2	5–2	5–2	—

==== Pool C ====
Athlete	PHI	JPN	KOR	KAZ	THA	IRI	CHN
Michael Cena (PHI)	—	3–5	5–2	0–5	5–1	4–5	1–5
Hiroki Fujii (JPN)	5–3	—	2–5	5–4	5–2	5–2	4–5
Kim Seung-pyo (KOR)	2–5	5–2	—	5–1	5–3	5–0	5–3
Andrey Kolganov (KAZ)	5–0	4–5	1–5	—	5–1	5–3	3–5
Surachai Udomsuk (THA)	1–5	2–5	3–5	1–5	—	0–5	1–5
Hamid Reza Veisi (IRI)	5–4	2–5	0–5	3–5	5–0	—	1–5
Wang Haibin (CHN)	5–1	5–4	3–5	5–3	5–1	5–1	—

==== Pool D ====
Athlete	KUW	PHI	KOR	IRI	JPN	HKG
Abdulmohsen Shahrayen (KUW)	—	5–1	3–5	5–3	5–4	5–2
Ramil Endriano (PHI)	1–5	—	0–5	5–4	2–5	1–5
Kim Young-ho (KOR)	5–3	5–0	—	5–1	5–4	5–1
Mohammad Mirmohammadi (IRI)	3–5	4–5	1–5	—	0–5	5–1
Naoto Okazaki (JPN)	4–5	5–2	4–5	5–0	—	5–0
Tsui Man Sum (HKG)	2–5	5–1	1–5	1–5	0–5	—

==== Summary ====
Rank	Pool	Athlete	W	L	W/M	TD	TF
1	B	You Bong-hyung (KOR)	6	0	1.000	+16	30
2	D	Kim Young-ho (KOR)	5	0	1.000	+16	25
3	A	Dong Zhaozhi (CHN)	5	1	0.833	+17	29
4	A	Yusuke Aoki (JPN)	5	1	0.833	+13	28
4	C	Wang Haibin (CHN)	5	1	0.833	+13	28
6	C	Kim Seung-pyo (KOR)	5	1	0.833	+13	27
7	B	Salman Mohammad (KUW)	5	1	0.833	+6	27
8	D	Abdulmohsen Shahrayen (KUW)	4	1	0.800	+8	23
9	A	Vyacheslav Grigoryev (KAZ)	4	2	0.667	+8	26
10	C	Hiroki Fujii (JPN)	4	2	0.667	+5	26
11	D	Naoto Okazaki (JPN)	3	2	0.600	+11	23
12	B	Lin Liang (CHN)	3	3	0.500	+5	25
13	C	Andrey Kolganov (KAZ)	3	3	0.500	+4	23
14	A	Othman Al-Shammari (KUW)	3	3	0.500	0	22
15	B	Preecha Tuntiruk (THA)	3	3	0.500	−4	20
16	A	Lau Kwok Kin (HKG)	2	4	0.333	−2	20
17	B	Nail Gubaidullin (KAZ)	2	4	0.333	−4	18
18	C	Michael Cena (PHI)	2	4	0.333	−5	18
19	C	Hamid Reza Veisi (IRI)	2	4	0.333	−8	16
20	A	Ramon Portugal (PHI)	2	4	0.333	−13	14
21	D	Mohammad Mirmohammadi (IRI)	1	4	0.200	−8	13
22	D	Tsui Man Sum (HKG)	1	4	0.200	−12	9
23	D	Ramil Endriano (PHI)	1	4	0.200	−15	9
24	B	Wong Kam Kau (HKG)	1	5	0.167	−9	18
25	B	Keivan Javanshir (IRI)	1	5	0.167	−10	17
26	C	Surachai Udomsuk (THA)	0	6	0.000	−22	8
27	A	Nikorn Papakdee (THA)	0	6	0.000	−23	7

=== Knockout round ===
==== Finals ====
Final
5	Wang Haibin (CHN)	15
2	Kim Young-ho (KOR)	7

Bronze medal match
1	You Bong-hyung (KOR)	15
3	Dong Zhaozhi (CHN)	13

==== Top half ====
Round of 32
17	Nail Gubaidullin (KAZ)	13
16	Lau Kwok Kin (HKG)	15
9	Vyacheslav Grigoryev (KAZ)	15
24	Wong Kam Kau (HKG)	14
25	Keivan Javanshir (IRI)	9
8	Abdulmohsen Shahrayen (KUW)	15
21	Mohammad Mirmohammadi (IRI)	7
12	Lin Liang (CHN)	15
13	Andrey Kolganov (KAZ)	15
20	Ramon Portugal (PHI)	2

Round of 16
1	You Bong-hyung (KOR)	15
16	Lau Kwok Kin (HKG)	5
9	Vyacheslav Grigoryev (KAZ)	4
8	Abdulmohsen Shahrayen (KUW)	15
5	Wang Haibin (CHN)	15
12	Lin Liang (CHN)	6
13	Andrey Kolganov (KAZ)	6
4	Yusuke Aoki (JPN)	15

Quarterfinals
1	You Bong-hyung (KOR)	15
8	Abdulmohsen Shahrayen (KUW)	4
5	Wang Haibin (CHN)	15
4	Yusuke Aoki (JPN)	10

Semifinals
1	You Bong-hyung (KOR)	4
5	Wang Haibin (CHN)	15

==== Bottom half ====
Round of 32
19	Hamid Reza Veisi (IRI)	15
14	Othman Al-Shammari (KUW)	10
11	Naoto Okazaki (JPN)	15
22	Tsui Man Sum (HKG)	3
27	Nikorn Papakdee (THA)	5
6	Kim Seung-pyo (KOR)	15
7	Salman Mohammad (KUW)	15
26	Surachai Udomsuk (THA)	9
23	Ramil Endriano (PHI)	4
10	Hiroki Fujii (JPN)	15
15	Preecha Tuntiruk (THA)	7
18	Michael Cena (PHI)	15

Round of 16
3	Dong Zhaozhi (CHN)	15
19	Hamid Reza Veisi (IRI)	4
11	Naoto Okazaki (JPN)	15
6	Kim Seung-pyo (KOR)	8
7	Salman Mohammad (KUW)	8
10	Hiroki Fujii (JPN)	15
18	Michael Cena (PHI)	5
2	Kim Young-ho (KOR)	15

Quarterfinals
3	Dong Zhaozhi (CHN)	15
11	Naoto Okazaki (JPN)	7
10	Hiroki Fujii (JPN)	5
2	Kim Young-ho (KOR)	15

Semifinals
3	Dong Zhaozhi (CHN)	7
2	Kim Young-ho (KOR)	15
