= Fencing at the 1998 Asian Games – Men's team épée =

Men's team épée at the 1998 Asian Games
- Venue: Thammasat Gymnasium 4
- Date: 17 December 1998
- Nations: 9

Medalists
gold medal	South Korea; Choi Yong-chul, Lee Sang-ki, Lee Sang-yup, Yang Roy-sung
silver medal	Kazakhstan; Alexandr Axenov, Dmitriy Dimov, Alexey Pistsov, Sergey Shabalin
bronze medal	China; Dong Zhaozhi, Wang Qibing, Xiao Jian, Zhao Gang

The men's team épée competition at the 1998 Asian Games in Bangkok was held on 17 December 1998 at the Thammasat Gymnasium 4.

The field of nine teams competed in a single-elimination tournament to determine the medal winners. Semifinal losers proceeded to a bronze medal match. Each match features the three fencers on each team competing in a round-robin, with 9 three-minute bouts to 5 points; the winning team is the one that reaches 45 total points first or is leading after the end of the nine bouts. Standard épée rules regarding target area, striking, and priority are used.

The top seed South Korea (Choi Yong-chul, Lee Sang-ki, Lee Sang-yup and Yang Roy-sung) won the gold medal after beating the defending champion (third seed) Kazakhstan (Alexandr Axenov, Dmitriy Dimov, Alexey Pistsov and Sergey Shabalin) in the final 45-37. The second seed China (Dong Zhaozhi, Wang Qibing, Xiao Jian, Zhao Gang) won the bronze medal by a 45-32 win over Kyrgyzstan.

== Schedule ==
All times are Indochina Time (UTC+07:00)

Date	Time	Event
Thursday, 17 December 1998	09:00	Preliminaries
Thursday, 17 December 1998	16:00	Finals

== Results ==
Round of 16
9	Philippines	45
8	Kuwait	40

Quarterfinals
1	South Korea	45
9	Philippines	12
5	Japan	35
4	Kyrgyzstan	45
3	Kazakhstan	45
6	Iran	35
7	Thailand	21
2	China	45

Semifinals
1	South Korea	45
4	Kyrgyzstan	31
3	Kazakhstan	45
2	China	42

Final
1	South Korea	45
3	Kazakhstan	37
Bronze medal match
4	Kyrgyzstan	32
2	China	45
