= Fencing at the 2002 Asian Games – Women's individual sabre =

Women's individual sabre at the 2002 Asian Games
- Venue: Gangseo Gymnasium
- Date: 30 September 2002
- Competitors: 9 from 5 nations

Medalists
gold medal	Lee Shin-mi	South Korea
silver medal	Lee Gyu-young	South Korea
bronze medal	Tan Xue	China

The women's individual sabre competition at the 2002 Asian Games in Busan was held on 30 September at the Gangseo Gymnasium.

== Schedule ==
All times are Korea Standard Time (UTC+09:00)

Date	Time	Event
Monday, 30 September 2002	10:00	Preliminary pool
Monday, 30 September 2002	12:00	Quarterfinals
Monday, 30 September 2002	12:00	Semifinals
Monday, 30 September 2002	19:30	Finals

== Results ==
=== Preliminary pool ===
Rank	Pool	Athlete	W	L	W/M	TD	TF
1	1	Tan Xue (CHN)	3	1	0.750	+7	18
2	1	Madoka Hisagae (JPN)	3	1	0.750	+2	16
3	2	Chow Tsz Ki (HKG)	2	1	0.667	+3	14
4	2	Chiyo Ogawa (JPN)	2	1	0.667	+1	14
5	2	Lee Shin-mi (KOR)	2	1	0.667	0	12
6	1	Lee Gyu-young (KOR)	2	2	0.500	0	16
7	1	Akina Pau (HKG)	2	2	0.500	−1	15
8	2	Zhang Ying (CHN)	0	3	0.000	−4	11
9	1	Lenita Reyes (PHI)	0	4	0.000	−8	12

=== Knockout round ===
Quarterfinals
1	Tan Xue (CHN)	15
8	Zhang Ying (CHN)	9
5	Lee Shin-mi (KOR)	15
4	Chiyo Ogawa (JPN)	9
3	Chow Tsz Ki (HKG)	11
6	Lee Gyu-young (KOR)	15
7	Akina Pau (HKG)	14
2	Madoka Hisagae (JPN)	15

Semifinals
1	Tan Xue (CHN)	11
5	Lee Shin-mi (KOR)	15
6	Lee Gyu-young (KOR)	15
2	Madoka Hisagae (JPN)	14

Final
5	Lee Shin-mi (KOR)	15
6	Lee Gyu-young (KOR)	8
3rd–4th place
1	Tan Xue (CHN)	15
2	Madoka Hisagae (JPN)	8

== Final standing ==
Rank	Athlete
1st place, gold medalist(s)	Lee Shin-mi (KOR)
2nd place, silver medalist(s)	Lee Gyu-young (KOR)
3rd place, bronze medalist(s)	Tan Xue (CHN)
4	Madoka Hisagae (JPN)
5	Chow Tsz Ki (HKG)
6	Chiyo Ogawa (JPN)
7	Akina Pau (HKG)
8	Zhang Ying (CHN)
9	Lenita Reyes (PHI)
