= Fencing at the 1998 Asian Games – Men's team foil =

Men's team foil at the 1998 Asian Games
- Venue: Thammasat Gymnasium 4
- Date: 15 December 1998
- Nations: 9

Medalists
gold medal	China; Dong Zhaozhi, Lin Liang, Liu Yuntao, Wang Haibin
silver medal	Japan; Yusuke Aoki, Hiroki Fujii, Hiroki Ichigatani, Naoto Okazaki
bronze medal	South Korea; Kim Seung-pyo, Kim Woon-sung, Kim Young-ho, You Bong-hyung

The men's team foil competition at the 1998 Asian Games in Bangkok was held on 15 December 1998 at the Thammasat Gymnasium 4.

The field of nine teams competed in a single-elimination tournament to determine the medal winners. Semifinal losers proceeded to a bronze medal match. Each match features the three fencers on each team competing in a round-robin, with 9 three-minute bouts to 5 points; the winning team is the one that reaches 45 total points first or is leading after the end of the nine bouts. Standard foil rules regarding target area, striking, and priority are used.

The top seed China (Dong Zhaozhi, Lin Liang, Liu Yuntao and Wang Haibin) won the gold medal after beating Japan (Yusuke Aoki, Hiroki Fujii, Hiroki Ichigatani and Naoto Okazaki) in the final 45-35. South Korea (Kim Seung-pyo, Kim Woon-sung, Kim Young-ho and You Bong-hyung) won the bronze medal by a 45-34 win over Kuwait (Othman Al-Shammari, Salman Mohammad, Abdulmohsen Shahrayen and Fares Abdulrazzaq).

== Schedule ==
All times are Indochina Time (UTC+07:00)

Date	Time	Event
Tuesday, 15 December 1998	09:00	Preliminaries
Tuesday, 15 December 1998	16:00	Finals

== Results ==
Round of 16
9	Thailand	34
8	Philippines	45

Quarterfinals
1	China	45
8	Philippines	29
5	Kazakhstan	33
4	Kuwait	45
3	Japan	45
6	Hong Kong	26
7	Iran	18
2	South Korea	45

Semifinals
1	China	45
4	Kuwait	17
3	Japan	45
2	South Korea	43

Final
1	China	45
3	Japan	35
Bronze medal match
4	Kuwait	34
2	South Korea	45
