= Fencing at the 2002 Asian Games – Women's individual épée =

Women's individual épée at the 2002 Asian Games
- Venue: Gangseo Gymnasium
- Date: 1 October 2002
- Competitors: 17 from 11 nations

Medalists
gold medal	Kim Hee-jeong	South Korea
silver medal	Hyun Hee	South Korea
bronze medal	Shen Weiwei	China

The women's individual épée competition at the 2002 Asian Games in Busan was held on 1 October at the Gangseo Gymnasium.

== Schedule ==
All times are Korea Standard Time (UTC+09:00)

Date	Time	Event
Tuesday, 1 October 2002	10:00	Preliminary pool
Tuesday, 1 October 2002	13:00	1/8 elimination
Tuesday, 1 October 2002	13:00	Quarterfinals
Tuesday, 1 October 2002	13:00	Semifinals
Tuesday, 1 October 2002	19:30	Finals

== Results ==
Legend

- DNS — Did not start

=== Preliminary pool ===
Rank	Pool	Athlete	W	L	W/M	TD	TF
1	3	Shen Weiwei (CHN)	5	0	1.000	+16	22
2	1	Yekaterina Skornevskaya (KAZ)	4	1	0.800	+12	20
3	3	Kim Hee-jeong (KOR)	4	1	0.800	+8	21
4	1	Hyun Hee (KOR)	4	1	0.800	+8	19
5	1	Yeung Chui Ling (HKG)	4	1	0.800	+5	14
6	2	Ho Ka Lai (HKG)	2	1	0.667	+6	13
7	2	Li Na (CHN)	2	1	0.667	+2	12
8	3	Chieko Sugawara (JPN)	3	2	0.600	+5	19
9	1	Olga Verulskaya (KGZ)	2	3	0.400	−7	16
10	3	Lorena San Diego (PHI)	2	3	0.400	−7	13
11	2	Natalia Goncharova (KAZ)	1	2	0.333	−2	11
12	2	Tatiana Kostina (KGZ)	1	2	0.333	−6	7
13	1	Lorella Bauzon (PHI)	1	4	0.200	−3	13
14	3	Siritida Choochokkul (THA)	1	4	0.200	−8	12
15	3	Mira Mansour (PLE)	0	5	0.000	−14	11
16	1	Wejdan Neimat (JOR)	0	5	0.000	−15	9
—	2	Aude El-Hawa (LIB)			DNS		

=== Knockout round ===
1/8 elimination
9	Olga Verulskaya (KGZ)	10
8	Chieko Sugawara (JPN)	15
5	Yeung Chui Ling (HKG)	14
12	Tatiana Kostina (KGZ)	11
13	Lorella Bauzon (PHI)	4
4	Hyun Hee (KOR)	15
11	Natalia Goncharova (KAZ)	15
6	Ho Ka Lai (HKG)	10
7	Li Na (CHN)	15
10	Lorena San Diego (PHI)	8

Quarterfinals
1	Shen Weiwei (CHN)	15
8	Chieko Sugawara (JPN)	8
5	Yeung Chui Ling (HKG)	7
4	Hyun Hee (KOR)	15
3	Kim Hee-jeong (KOR)	15
11	Natalia Goncharova (KAZ)	4
7	Li Na (CHN)	15
2	Yekaterina Skornevskaya (KAZ)	12

Semifinals
1	Shen Weiwei (CHN)	10
4	Hyun Hee (KOR)	15
3	Kim Hee-jeong (KOR)	7
7	Li Na (CHN)	6

Final
4	Hyun Hee (KOR)	14
3	Kim Hee-jeong (KOR)	15
3rd–4th place
1	Shen Weiwei (CHN)	11
7	Li Na (CHN)	10

== Final standing ==
Rank	Athlete
1st place, gold medalist(s)	Kim Hee-jeong (KOR)
2nd place, silver medalist(s)	Hyun Hee (KOR)
3rd place, bronze medalist(s)	Shen Weiwei (CHN)
4	Li Na (CHN)
5	Yekaterina Skornevskaya (KAZ)
6	Yeung Chui Ling (HKG)
7	Chieko Sugawara (JPN)
8	Natalia Goncharova (KAZ)
9	Ho Ka Lai (HKG)
10	Olga Verulskaya (KGZ)
11	Lorena San Diego (PHI)
12	Tatiana Kostina (KGZ)
13	Lorella Bauzon (PHI)
14	Siritida Choochokkul (THA)
15	Mira Mansour (PLE)
16	Wejdan Neimat (JOR)
17	Aude El-Hawa (LIB)
