= Fencing at the 2002 Asian Games – Men's individual foil =

Men's individual foil at the 2002 Asian Games
- Venue: Gangseo Gymnasium
- Date: 29 September 2002
- Competitors: 20 from 12 nations

Medalists
gold medal	Wang Haibin	China
silver medal	Kim Sang-hun	South Korea
bronze medal	Wu Hanxiong	China

The men's individual foil competition at the 2002 Asian Games in Busan was held on 29 September at the Gangseo Gymnasium.

== Schedule ==
All times are Korea Standard Time (UTC+09:00)

Date	Time	Event
Sunday, 29 September 2002	10:00	Preliminary pool
Sunday, 29 September 2002	13:00	1/8 elimination
Sunday, 29 September 2002	13:00	Quarterfinals
Sunday, 29 September 2002	13:00	Semifinals
Sunday, 29 September 2002	20:00	Finals

== Results ==
=== Preliminary pool ===
Rank	Pool	Athlete	W	L	W/M	TD	TF
1	1	Wu Hanxiong (CHN)	4	0	1.000	+17	20
2	3	Lau Kwok Kin (HKG)	4	0	1.000	+16	20
3	4	Abdulmohsen Shahrayen (KUW)	4	0	1.000	+14	20
4	2	Emerson Segui (PHI)	4	0	1.000	+12	20
5	2	Kim Sang-hun (KOR)	3	1	0.750	+7	17
6	1	Hayato Shibuki (JPN)	3	1	0.750	+7	15
7	3	Othman Al-Shammari (KUW)	3	1	0.750	+2	16
8	4	Nontapat Panchan (THA)	2	2	0.500	+3	17
9	3	Takashi Okano (JPN)	2	2	0.500	+2	17
10	4	Wang Haibin (CHN)	2	2	0.500	+2	14
11	4	Kim Young-ho (KOR)	2	2	0.500	−1	14
12	2	Amer Al-Natour (JOR)	2	2	0.500	−2	11
13	1	Jasser Khader (JOR)	2	2	0.500	−5	12
14	2	Wong Kam Kau (HKG)	1	3	0.250	+1	16
15	1	Fady Tannous (LIB)	1	3	0.250	−4	12
16	3	Rolando Canlas (PHI)	1	3	0.250	−6	11
17	3	Zamel Al-Shemmari (QAT)	0	4	0.000	−14	6
18	1	Wong Soi Cheong (MAC)	0	4	0.000	−15	5
19	2	Mohammed Al-Mwas (PLE)	0	4	0.000	−18	2
19	4	Yahia Ahmed (QAT)	0	4	0.000	−18	2

=== Knockout round ===
1/8 elimination
1	Wu Hanxiong (CHN)	15
16	Rolando Canlas (PHI)	5
9	Takashi Okano (JPN)	15
8	Nontapat Panchan (THA)	9
5	Kim Sang-hun (KOR)	15
12	Amer Al-Natour (JOR)	11
13	Jasser Khader (JOR)	6
4	Emerson Segui (PHI)	15
3	Abdulmohsen Shahrayen (KUW)	15
14	Wong Kam Kau (HKG)	10
11	Kim Young-ho (KOR)	15
6	Hayato Shibuki (JPN)	14
7	Othman Al-Shammari (KUW)	6
10	Wang Haibin (CHN)	15
15	Fady Tannous (LIB)	5
2	Lau Kwok Kin (HKG)	15

Quarterfinals
1	Wu Hanxiong (CHN)	15
9	Takashi Okano (JPN)	8
5	Kim Sang-hun (KOR)	15
4	Emerson Segui (PHI)	7
3	Abdulmohsen Shahrayen (KUW)	10
11	Kim Young-ho (KOR)	15
10	Wang Haibin (CHN)	15
2	Lau Kwok Kin (HKG)	8

Semifinals
1	Wu Hanxiong (CHN)	13
5	Kim Sang-hun (KOR)	15
11	Kim Young-ho (KOR)	9
10	Wang Haibin (CHN)	15

Final
5	Kim Sang-hun (KOR)	11
10	Wang Haibin (CHN)	15
3rd–4th place
1	Wu Hanxiong (CHN)	15
11	Kim Young-ho (KOR)	13

== Final standing ==
Rank	Athlete
1st place, gold medalist(s)	Wang Haibin (CHN)
2nd place, silver medalist(s)	Kim Sang-hun (KOR)
3rd place, bronze medalist(s)	Wu Hanxiong (CHN)
4	Kim Young-ho (KOR)
5	Lau Kwok Kin (HKG)
6	Abdulmohsen Shahrayen (KUW)
7	Emerson Segui (PHI)
8	Takashi Okano (JPN)
9	Hayato Shibuki (JPN)
10	Othman Al-Shammari (KUW)
11	Nontapat Panchan (THA)
12	Amer Al-Natour (JOR)
13	Jasser Khader (JOR)
14	Wong Kam Kau (HKG)
15	Fady Tannous (LIB)
16	Rolando Canlas (PHI)
17	Zamel Al-Shemmari (QAT)
18	Wong Soi Cheong (MAC)
19	Mohammed Al-Mwas (PLE)
20	Yahia Ahmed (QAT)
