= Fencing at the 2002 Asian Games – Women's team épée =

Women's team épée at the 2002 Asian Games
- Venue: Gangseo Gymnasium
- Date: 4 October 2002
- Competitors: 23 from 6 nations

Medalists
gold medal	South Korea; Hyun Hee, Kim Hee-jeong, Kim Mi-jung, Lee Keum-nam
silver medal	China; Li Na, Shen Weiwei, Zhang Li, Zhong Weiping
bronze medal	Hong Kong; Bjork Cheng, Cheung Yi Nei, Ho Ka Lai, Yeung Chui Ling

The women's team épée competition at the 2002 Asian Games in Busan, South Korea was held on 4 October 2002 at the Gangseo Gymnasium.

== Schedule ==
All times are Korea Standard Time (UTC+09:00)

Date	Time	Event
Friday, 4 October 2002	10:00	Quarterfinals
Friday, 4 October 2002	10:00	Semifinals
Friday, 4 October 2002	10:00	Classification
Friday, 4 October 2002	19:30	Finals

== Results ==
Quarterfinals
5	Philippines	18
4	Hong Kong	19
3	Kazakhstan	39
6	Kyrgyzstan	31

Semifinals
1	China	35
4	Hong Kong	29
3	Kazakhstan	32
2	South Korea	45

Final
1	China	35
2	South Korea	45
3rd–4th place
4	Hong Kong	39
3	Kazakhstan	29

5th–6th place
5	Philippines	33
6	Kyrgyzstan	45

== Final standing ==
Rank	Team
1st place, gold medalist(s)	South Korea (KOR); Hyun Hee; Kim Hee-jeong; Kim Mi-jung; Lee Keum-nam
2nd place, silver medalist(s)	China (CHN); Li Na; Shen Weiwei; Zhang Li; Zhong Weiping
3rd place, bronze medalist(s)	Hong Kong (HKG); Bjork Cheng; Cheung Yi Nei; Ho Ka Lai; Yeung Chui Ling
4	Kazakhstan (KAZ); Natalia Goncharova; Margarita Michshuk; Zarina Mukhamejanova; Yekaterina Skornevskaya
5	Kyrgyzstan (KGZ); Roza Bikkinina; Tatiana Kostina; Paulina Struchkova; Olga Verulskaya
6	Philippines (PHI); Lorella Bauzon; Lenita Reyes; Lorena San Diego
