= Meng Jie =

Meng Jie may refer to:

- Meng Jie (fencer), a Chinese fencer.
- Meng Jie, a fictional character in the historical novel Romance of the Three Kingdoms. See List of fictional people of the Three Kingdoms#Chapter 89.
