= Fencing at the 2006 Asian Games – Women's individual foil =

Women's individual foil at the 2006 Asian Games
- Venue: Al-Arabi Indoor Hall
- Date: 11 December 2006
- Competitors: 21 from 11 nations

Medalists
gold medal	Nam Hyun-hee	South Korea
silver medal	Seo Mi-jung	South Korea
bronze medal	Yoko Makishita	Japan
bronze medal	Chen Jinyan	China

The women's individual foil competition at the 2006 Asian Games in Doha was held on 11 December at the Al-Arabi Indoor Hall.

== Schedule ==
All times are Arabia Standard Time (UTC+03:00)

Date	Time	Event
Monday, 11 December 2006	09:00	Round of pools
Monday, 11 December 2006	11:00	Round of 16
Monday, 11 December 2006	11:50	Quarterfinals
Monday, 11 December 2006	18:00	Semifinals
Monday, 11 December 2006	19:20	Gold medal match

== Results ==
=== Round of pools ===
==== Pool 1 ====
Athlete	KOR	JPN	VIE	PHI	MAC	KUW	QAT
Nam Hyun-hee (KOR)	—	5–2	5–0	5–0	5–0	5–0	5–0
Yoko Makishita (JPN)	2–5	—	5–1	5–4	5–1	5–0	5–1
Nguyễn Thị Nguyệt (VIE)	0–5	1–5	—	2–4	5–3	5–0	5–1
Veena Tessa Nuestro (PHI)	0–5	4–5	4–2	—	5–1	5–3	5–0
U Nga Fong (MAC)	0–5	1–5	3–5	1–5	—	5–3	5–2
Ameinah Al-Ali (KUW)	0–5	0–5	0–5	3–5	3–5	—	5–3
Ghareeba Hammad (QAT)	0–5	1–5	1–5	0–5	2–5	3–5	—

==== Pool 2 ====
Athlete	JPN	CHN	KAZ	SIN	THA	VIE	MAC
Chieko Sugawara (JPN)	—	3–4	4–3	5–3	5–1	5–2	5–0
Huang Jialing (CHN)	4–3	—	3–5	4–5	5–4	5–2	5–0
Olga Antipova (KAZ)	3–4	5–3	—	5–0	4–5	5–1	5–2
Tay Yu Ling (SIN)	3–5	5–4	0–5	—	5–4	3–2	5–3
Nunta Chantasuvannasin (THA)	1–5	4–5	5–4	4–5	—	5–2	5–1
Nguyễn Thị Tươi (VIE)	2–5	2–5	1–5	2–3	2–5	—	2–5
Chek Soi Lin (MAC)	0–5	0–5	2–5	3–5	1–5	5–2	—

==== Pool 3 ====
Athlete	CHN	KOR	SIN	KUW	IND	QAT	KAZ
Chen Jinyan (CHN)	—	2–3	5–2	5–0	5–2	5–0	5–3
Seo Mi-jung (KOR)	3–2	—	5–2	5–0	5–0	5–0	5–0
Ruth Ng (SIN)	2–5	2–5	—	5–0	3–5	4–5	5–3
Jamilah Sawedan (KUW)	0–5	0–5	0–5	—	0–5	1–5	1–5
E. Gita Devi (IND)	2–5	0–5	5–3	5–0	—	5–4	0–5
Afraa Jumah (QAT)	0–5	0–5	5–4	5–1	4–5	—	2–5
Yelena Kazantseva (KAZ)	3–5	0–5	3–5	5–1	5–0	5–2	—

==== Summary ====
Rank	Pool	Athlete	W	L	W/M	TD	TF
1	1	Nam Hyun-hee (KOR)	6	0	1.000	+28	30
2	3	Seo Mi-jung (KOR)	6	0	1.000	+24	28
3	3	Chen Jinyan (CHN)	5	1	0.833	+17	27
4	1	Yoko Makishita (JPN)	5	1	0.833	+15	27
5	2	Chieko Sugawara (JPN)	5	1	0.833	+14	27
6	2	Olga Antipova (KAZ)	4	2	0.667	+12	27
7	2	Huang Jialing (CHN)	4	2	0.667	+7	26
8	1	Veena Tessa Nuestro (PHI)	4	2	0.667	+7	23
9	2	Tay Yu Ling (SIN)	4	2	0.667	−2	21
10	3	Yelena Kazantseva (KAZ)	3	3	0.500	+3	21
11	2	Nunta Chantasuvannasin (THA)	3	3	0.500	+2	24
12	1	Nguyễn Thị Nguyệt (VIE)	3	3	0.500	0	18
13	3	E. Gita Devi (IND)	3	3	0.500	−5	17
14	3	Ruth Ng (SIN)	2	4	0.333	−2	21
15	3	Afraa Jumah (QAT)	2	4	0.333	−9	16
16	1	U Nga Fong (MAC)	2	4	0.333	−10	15
17	2	Chek Soi Lin (MAC)	1	5	0.167	−16	11
18	1	Ameinah Al-Ali (KUW)	1	5	0.167	−17	11
19	2	Nguyễn Thị Tươi (VIE)	0	6	0.000	−17	11
20	1	Ghareeba Hammad (QAT)	0	6	0.000	−23	7
21	3	Jamilah Sawedan (KUW)	0	6	0.000	−28	2

=== Knockout round ===
Round of 16
1	Nam Hyun-hee (KOR)	15
16	U Nga Fong (MAC)	0
9	Tay Yu Ling (SIN)	15
8	Veena Tessa Nuestro (PHI)	8
5	Chieko Sugawara (JPN)	15
12	Nguyễn Thị Nguyệt (VIE)	4
13	E. Gita Devi (IND)	1
4	Yoko Makishita (JPN)	15
3	Chen Jinyan (CHN)	15
14	Ruth Ng (SIN)	1
11	Nunta Chantasuvannasin (THA)	8
6	Olga Antipova (KAZ)	15
7	Huang Jialing (CHN)	15
10	Yelena Kazantseva (KAZ)	3
15	Afraa Jumah (QAT)	2
2	Seo Mi-jung (KOR)	15

Quarterfinals
1	Nam Hyun-hee (KOR)	15
9	Tay Yu Ling (SIN)	2
5	Chieko Sugawara (JPN)	7
4	Yoko Makishita (JPN)	15
3	Chen Jinyan (CHN)	15
6	Olga Antipova (KAZ)	12
7	Huang Jialing (CHN)	4
2	Seo Mi-jung (KOR)	11

Semifinals
1	Nam Hyun-hee (KOR)	15
4	Yoko Makishita (JPN)	7
3	Chen Jinyan (CHN)	8
2	Seo Mi-jung (KOR)	14

Gold medal match
1	Nam Hyun-hee (KOR)	15
2	Seo Mi-jung (KOR)	10

== Final standing ==
Rank	Athlete
1st place, gold medalist(s)	Nam Hyun-hee (KOR)
2nd place, silver medalist(s)	Seo Mi-jung (KOR)
3rd place, bronze medalist(s)	Yoko Makishita (JPN)
3rd place, bronze medalist(s)	Chen Jinyan (CHN)
5	Chieko Sugawara (JPN)
6	Olga Antipova (KAZ)
7	Huang Jialing (CHN)
8	Tay Yu Ling (SIN)
9	Veena Tessa Nuestro (PHI)
10	Yelena Kazantseva (KAZ)
11	Nunta Chantasuvannasin (THA)
12	Nguyễn Thị Nguyệt (VIE)
13	E. Gita Devi (IND)
14	Ruth Ng (SIN)
15	Afraa Jumah (QAT)
16	U Nga Fong (MAC)
17	Chek Soi Lin (MAC)
18	Ameinah Al-Ali (KUW)
19	Nguyễn Thị Tươi (VIE)
20	Ghareeba Hammad (QAT)
21	Jamilah Sawedan (KUW)
