= Fencing at the 2006 Asian Games – Men's individual épée =

Men's individual épée at the 2006 Asian Games
- Venue: Al-Arabi Indoor Hall
- Date: 11 December 2006
- Competitors: 27 from 15 nations

Medalists
gold medal	Wang Lei	China
silver medal	Xie Yongjun	China
bronze medal	Ali Yaghoubian	Iran
bronze medal	Kim Seung-gu	South Korea

The men's individual épée competition at the 2006 Asian Games in Doha was held on 11 December at the Al-Arabi Indoor Hall.

== Schedule ==
All times are Arabia Standard Time (UTC+03:00)

Date	Time	Event
Monday, 11 December 2006	13:05	Round of pools
Monday, 11 December 2006	15:05	Round of 32
Monday, 11 December 2006	15:55	Round of 16
Monday, 11 December 2006	16:45	Quarterfinals
Monday, 11 December 2006	18:40	Semifinals
Monday, 11 December 2006	19:40	Gold medal match

== Results ==
Legend

- R — Retired

=== Round of pools ===
==== Pool 1 ====
Athlete	CHN	KAZ	IRI	AFG	MAC	KGZ	PHI
Wang Lei (CHN)	—	5–2	5–2	5–2	5–0	5–2	3–2
Sergey Shabalin (KAZ)	2–5	—	5–3	5–0	5–1	3–2	3–4
Mohammad Rezaei (IRI)	2–5	3–5	—	5–1	5–2	4–5	5–0
Farooq Muzammil (AFG)	2–5	0–5	1–5	—	4–5	0–5	4–5
Hoi Kio Heng (MAC)	0–5	1–5	2–5	5–4	—	2–5	2–5
Mirsait Mirdjaliev (KGZ)	2–5	2–3	5–4	5–0	5–2	—	4–5
Avelino Victorino (PHI)	2–3	4–3	0–5	5–4	5–2	5–4	—

==== Pool 2 ====
Athlete	KOR	IRI	CHN	UZB	LIB	BRN	IRQ
Kim Seung-gu (KOR)	—	3–5	2–3	5–2	5–3	5–3	5–0
Ali Yaghoubian (IRI)	5–3	—	2–5	5–1	5–4	5–3	5–0
Xie Yongjun (CHN)	3–2	5–2	—	5–2	5–3	5–3	5–3
Alexandr Filinov (UZB)	2–5	1–5	2–5	—	1–5	5–4	5–1
Chafic El-Khoury (LIB)	3–5	4–5	3–5	5–1	—	5–4	5–2
Salah Busafar (BRN)	3–5	3–5	3–5	4–5	4–5	—	4–5
Saad Salih (IRQ)	0–5	0–5	3–5	1–5	2–5	5–4	—

==== Pool 3 ====
Athlete	KAZ	KOR	KUW	QAT	UZB	PHI	LIB
Alexandr Axenov (KAZ)	—	2–5	3–5	5–2	4–3	3–2	4–3
Kim Won-jin (KOR)	5–2	—	5–3	5–3	4–5	3–0	5–4
Hamad Al-Awadhi (KUW)	5–3	3–5	—	5–1	1–5	3–5	5–4
Abdullah Jamaan (QAT)	2–5	3–5	1–5	—	3–5	3–2	5–3
Roman Aleksandrov (UZB)	3–4	5–4	5–1	5–3	—	5–3	3–5
Wilfredo Vizcayno (PHI)	2–3	0–3	5–3	2–3	3–5	—	5–2
Victor Fayad (LIB)	3–4	4–5	4–5	3–5	5–3	2–5	—

==== Pool 4 ====
Athlete	JPN	KUW	QAT	BRN	KGZ	IRQ
Keisuke Sakamoto (JPN)	—	4–2	5–2	5–2	5–4	5–3
Hasan Malallah (KUW)	2–4	—	5–4	4–5	2–5	5–4
Adel Al-Jailani (QAT)	2–5	4–5	—	5–2	5–4	5–4
Abdulrahman Khaled (BRN)	2–5	5–4	2–5	—	3–5	5–2
Aleksandr Poddubny (KGZ)	4–5	5–2	4–5	5–3	—	5–1
Haidar Mohammed (IRQ)	3–5	4–5	4–5	2–5	1–5	—

==== Summary ====
Rank	Pool	Athlete	W	L	W/M	TD	TF
1	1	Wang Lei (CHN)	6	0	1.000	+18	28
2	2	Xie Yongjun (CHN)	6	0	1.000	+13	28
3	4	Keisuke Sakamoto (JPN)	5	0	1.000	+11	24
4	2	Ali Yaghoubian (IRI)	5	1	0.833	+11	27
5	3	Kim Won-jin (KOR)	5	1	0.833	+10	27
6	2	Kim Seung-gu (KOR)	4	2	0.667	+9	25
7	1	Sergey Shabalin (KAZ)	4	2	0.667	+8	23
8	3	Roman Aleksandrov (UZB)	4	2	0.667	+6	26
9	3	Alexandr Axenov (KAZ)	4	2	0.667	+1	21
10	1	Avelino Victorino (PHI)	4	2	0.667	0	21
11	4	Aleksandr Poddubny (KGZ)	3	2	0.600	+7	23
12	4	Adel Al-Jailani (QAT)	3	2	0.600	+1	21
13	1	Mohammad Rezaei (IRI)	3	3	0.500	+6	24
14	1	Mirsait Mirdjaliev (KGZ)	3	3	0.500	+4	23
15	2	Chafic El-Khoury (LIB)	3	3	0.500	+3	25
16	3	Hamad Al-Awadhi (KUW)	3	3	0.500	−1	22
17	4	Hasan Malallah (KUW)	2	3	0.400	−4	18
18	4	Abdulrahman Khaled (BRN)	2	3	0.400	−4	17
19	3	Wilfredo Vizcayno (PHI)	2	4	0.333	−2	17
20	3	Abdullah Jamaan (QAT)	2	4	0.333	−8	17
21	2	Alexandr Filinov (UZB)	2	4	0.333	−9	16
22	3	Victor Fayad (LIB)	1	5	0.167	−6	21
23	1	Hoi Kio Heng (MAC)	1	5	0.167	−17	12
24	2	Saad Salih (IRQ)	1	5	0.167	−18	11
25	2	Salah Busafar (BRN)	0	6	0.000	−9	21
26	4	Haidar Mohammed (IRQ)	0	5	0.000	−11	14
27	1	Farooq Muzammil (AFG)	0	6	0.000	−19	11

=== Knockout round ===
==== Final ====
Gold medal match
1	Wang Lei (CHN)	15
2	Xie Yongjun (CHN)	8

==== Top half ====
Round of 32
17	Hasan Malallah (KUW)	13
16	Hamad Al-Awadhi (KUW)	15
21	Alexandr Filinov (UZB)	13
12	Adel Al-Jailani (QAT)	15
13	Mohammad Rezaei (IRI)	15
20	Abdullah Jamaan (QAT)	5

Round of 16
1	Wang Lei (CHN)	15
16	Hamad Al-Awadhi (KUW)	6
9	Alexandr Axenov (KAZ)	15
8	Roman Aleksandrov (UZB)	10
5	Kim Won-jin (KOR)	15
12	Adel Al-Jailani (QAT)	6
13	Mohammad Rezaei (IRI)	12
4	Ali Yaghoubian (IRI)	15

Quarterfinals
1	Wang Lei (CHN)	4
9	Alexandr Axenov (KAZ)	3
5	Kim Won-jin (KOR)	13
4	Ali Yaghoubian (IRI)	15

Semifinals
1	Wang Lei (CHN)	15
4	Ali Yaghoubian (IRI)	5

==== Bottom half ====
Round of 32
19	Wilfredo Vizcayno (PHI)	10
14	Mirsait Mirdjaliev (KGZ)	15
11	Aleksandr Poddubny (KGZ)	15
22	Victor Fayad (LIB)	13
15	Chafic El-Khoury (LIB)	15
18	Abdulrahman Khaled (BRN)	14

Round of 16
3	Keisuke Sakamoto (JPN)	15
14	Mirsait Mirdjaliev (KGZ)	10
11	Aleksandr Poddubny (KGZ)	6^{R}
6	Kim Seung-gu (KOR)	5
7	Sergey Shabalin (KAZ)	15
10	Avelino Victorino (PHI)	9
15	Chafic El-Khoury (LIB)	11
2	Xie Yongjun (CHN)	15

Quarterfinals
3	Keisuke Sakamoto (JPN)	10
6	Kim Seung-gu (KOR)	15
7	Sergey Shabalin (KAZ)	2
2	Xie Yongjun (CHN)	3

Semifinals
6	Kim Seung-gu (KOR)	6
2	Xie Yongjun (CHN)	7

== Final standing ==
Rank	Athlete
1st place, gold medalist(s)	Wang Lei (CHN)
2nd place, silver medalist(s)	Xie Yongjun (CHN)
3rd place, bronze medalist(s)	Ali Yaghoubian (IRI)
3rd place, bronze medalist(s)	Kim Seung-gu (KOR)
5	Keisuke Sakamoto (JPN)
6	Kim Won-jin (KOR)
7	Sergey Shabalin (KAZ)
8	Alexandr Axenov (KAZ)
9	Roman Aleksandrov (UZB)
10	Avelino Victorino (PHI)
11	Aleksandr Poddubny (KGZ)
12	Adel Al-Jailani (QAT)
13	Mohammad Rezaei (IRI)
14	Mirsait Mirdjaliev (KGZ)
15	Chafic El-Khoury (LIB)
16	Hamad Al-Awadhi (KUW)
17	Hasan Malallah (KUW)
18	Abdulrahman Khaled (BRN)
19	Wilfredo Vizcayno (PHI)
20	Abdullah Jamaan (QAT)
21	Alexandr Filinov (UZB)
22	Victor Fayad (LIB)
23	Hoi Kio Heng (MAC)
24	Saad Salih (IRQ)
25	Salah Busafar (BRN)
26	Haidar Mohammed (IRQ)
27	Farooq Muzammil (AFG)
