= Fencing at the 1998 Asian Games – Women's individual épée =

Women's individual épée at the 1998 Asian Games
- Venue: Thammasat Gymnasium 4
- Date: 11 December 1998
- Competitors: 25 from 9 nations

Medalists
gold medal	Ko Jung-sun	South Korea
silver medal	Shen Weiwei	China
bronze medal	Yang Shaoqi	China

The women's individual épée competition at the 1998 Asian Games in Bangkok was held on 11 December 1998 at the Thammasat Gymnasium 4.

== Schedule ==
All times are Indochina Time (UTC+07:00)

Date	Time	Event
Friday, 11 December 1998	09:00	Preliminaries
Friday, 11 December 1998	16:00	Finals

== Results ==
=== Round of pools ===
==== Pool A ====
Athlete	HKG	KOR	CHN	KAZ	INA	KGZ
Chan Siu San (HKG)	—	5–4	2–5	5–3	2–5	3–5
Lee Keum-nam (KOR)	4–5	—	1–5	5–4	4–5	5–1
Liang Qin (CHN)	5–2	5–1	—	5–2	2–5	5–4
Zarina Mukhamejanova (KAZ)	3–5	4–5	2–5	—	5–2	5–3
Sri Ayanti Satimin (INA)	5–2	5–4	5–2	2–5	—	3–5
Olga Verulskaya (KGZ)	5–3	1–5	4–5	3–5	5–3	—

==== Pool B ====
Athlete	HKG	KAZ	KOR	JPN	THA	KGZ
Cheung Yi Nei (HKG)	—	3–5	5–3	4–5	5–4	1–5
Darya Gaidenraikh (KAZ)	5–3	—	2–5	3–5	5–2	4–5
Lee Myung-hee (KOR)	3–5	5–2	—	5–4	5–2	5–2
Toshi Obata (JPN)	5–4	5–3	4–5	—	5–2	5–2
Teeraya Somprach (THA)	4–5	2–5	2–5	2–5	—	4–5
Svetlana Verulskaya (KGZ)	5–1	5–4	2–5	2–5	5–4	—

==== Pool C ====
Athlete	JPN	KAZ	HKG	INA	THA	KGZ	CHN
Yuko Arai (JPN)	—	5–3	3–5	3–5	5–1	5–3	3–5
Natalia Goncharova (KAZ)	3–5	—	3–5	3–5	5–1	5–1	5–2
Ho Ka Lai (HKG)	5–3	5–3	—	5–3	3–5	2–5	0–5
Silvia Koeswandi (INA)	5–3	5–3	3–5	—	5–0	5–2	0–5
Usa Pitakpisaed (THA)	1–5	1–5	5–3	0–5	—	3–5	2–5
Tatiana Ruban (KGZ)	3–5	1–5	5–2	2–5	5–3	—	5–4
Yang Shaoqi (CHN)	5–3	2–5	5–0	5–0	5–2	4–5	—

==== Pool D ====
Athlete	THA	PHI	KOR	JPN	CHN	INA
Janjila Binsolam (THA)	—	1–5	1–5	4–5	2–5	5–3
Roberta Gonzalez (PHI)	5–1	—	2–5	5–0	2–5	4–5
Ko Jung-sun (KOR)	5–1	5–2	—	5–2	5–2	5–3
Chieko Okada (JPN)	5–4	0–5	2–5	—	5–4	5–2
Shen Weiwei (CHN)	5–2	5–2	2–5	4–5	—	1–5
Mutti Susiarini (INA)	3–5	5–4	3–5	2–5	5–1	—

==== Summary ====
Rank	Pool	Athlete	W	L	W/M	TD	TF
1	D	Ko Jung-sun (KOR)	5	0	1.000	+15	25
2	B	Toshi Obata (JPN)	4	1	0.800	+8	24
3	B	Lee Myung-hee (KOR)	4	1	0.800	+8	23
4	A	Liang Qin (CHN)	4	1	0.800	+8	22
5	C	Yang Shaoqi (CHN)	4	2	0.667	+11	26
6	C	Silvia Koeswandi (INA)	4	2	0.667	+5	23
7	A	Sri Ayanti Satimin (KUW)	3	2	0.600	+2	20
8	B	Svetlana Verulskaya (KGZ)	3	2	0.600	0	19
9	D	Chieko Okada (JPN)	3	2	0.600	−3	17
10	C	Natalia Goncharova (KAZ)	3	3	0.500	+5	24
11	C	Yuko Arai (JPN)	3	3	0.500	+2	24
12	C	Tatiana Ruban (KGZ)	3	3	0.500	−3	21
13	C	Ho Ka Lai (HKG)	3	3	0.500	−4	20
14	D	Roberta Gonzalez (PHI)	2	3	0.400	+2	18
15	A	Zarina Mukhamejanova (KAZ)	2	3	0.400	−1	19
15	B	Darya Gaidenraikh (KAZ)	2	3	0.400	−1	19
15	A	Lee Keum-nam (KOR)	2	3	0.400	−1	19
18	D	Mutti Susiarini (INA)	2	3	0.400	−2	18
19	D	Shen Weiwei (CHN)	2	3	0.400	−2	17
20	A	Olga Verulskaya (KGZ)	2	3	0.400	−3	18
21	B	Cheung Yi Nei (HKG)	2	3	0.400	−4	18
22	A	Chan Siu San (HKG)	2	3	0.400	−5	17
23	D	Janjila Binsolam (THA)	1	4	0.200	−10	13
24	C	Usa Pitakpisaed (THA)	1	5	0.167	−16	12
25	B	Teeraya Somprach (THA)	0	5	0.000	−11	14

=== Knockout round ===
==== Finals ====
Final
1	Ko Jung-sun (KOR)	11
19	Shen Weiwei (CHN)	6

Bronze medal match
5	Yang Shaoqi (CHN)	15
2	Toshi Obata (JPN)	14

==== Top half ====
Round of 32
17	Lee Keum-nam (KOR)	15
16	Darya Gaidenraikh (KAZ)	14
9	Chieko Okada (JPN)	14
24	Usa Pitakpisaed (THA)	7
25	Teeraya Somprach (THA)	8
8	Svetlana Verulskaya (KGZ)	15
21	Cheung Yi Nei (HKG)	15
12	Tatiana Ruban (KGZ)	10
13	Ho Ka Lai (HKG)	15
20	Olga Verulskaya (KGZ)	10

Round of 16
1	Ko Jung-sun (KOR)	15
17	Lee Keum-nam (KOR)	10
9	Chieko Okada (JPN)	15
8	Svetlana Verulskaya (KGZ)	9
5	Yang Shaoqi (CHN)	15
21	Cheung Yi Nei (HKG)	5
13	Ho Ka Lai (HKG)	14
4	Liang Qin (CHN)	15

Quarterfinals
1	Ko Jung-sun (KOR)	15
9	Chieko Okada (JPN)	14
5	Yang Shaoqi (CHN)	15
4	Liang Qin (CHN)	13

Semifinals
1	Ko Jung-sun (KOR)	8
5	Yang Shaoqi (CHN)	5

==== Bottom half ====
Round of 32
19	Shen Weiwei (CHN)	15
14	Roberta Gonzalez (PHI)	9
11	Yuko Arai (JPN)	15
22	Chan Siu San (HKG)	8
23	Janjila Binsolam (THA)	3
10	Natalia Goncharova (KAZ)	15
15	Zarina Mukhamejanova (KAZ)	14
18	Mutti Susiarini (INA)	15

Round of 16
3	Lee Myung-hee (KOR)	5
19	Shen Weiwei (CHN)	6
11	Yuko Arai (JPN)	15
6	Silvia Koeswandi (INA)	3
7	Sri Ayanti Satimin (INA)	7
10	Natalia Goncharova (KAZ)	15
18	Mutti Susiarini (INA)	6
2	Toshi Obata (JPN)	12

Quarterfinals
19	Shen Weiwei (CHN)	13
11	Yuko Arai (JPN)	6
10	Natalia Goncharova (KAZ)	12
2	Toshi Obata (JPN)	13

Semifinals
19	Shen Weiwei (CHN)	14
2	Toshi Obata (JPN)	8
