= Fencing at the 2001 Summer Universiade =

Fencing events were contested at the 2001 Summer Universiade were held in Beijing, People's Republic of China.

== Medal overview ==
=== Men's events ===
Event	Gold	Silver	Bronze
Individual foil	Dong Zhaozhi (CHN)	Wang Haibin (CHN)	Vadim Ayupov (RUS); Lorenzo Mammi (ITA)
Team foil	China (CHN)	Italy (ITA)	France (FRA)
Individual épée	Denis Matthieu (FRA)	Maksym Khvorost (UKR)	Nikolai Novosjolov (EST); Aleksey Selin (RUS)
Team épée	France (FRA)	Italy (ITA)	Switzerland (SUI)
Individual sabre	Sergey Sharikov (RUS)	Gianpiero Pastore (ITA)	Alessandro Cavaliere (ITA); Aleksey Frosin (RUS)
Team sabre	Russia (RUS)	Italy (ITA)	Spain (ESP)

== Women's events ==
Event	Gold	Silver	Bronze
Individual foil	Valentina Vezzali (ITA)	Meng Jie (CHN)	Ekaterina Youcheva (RUS); Zhang Lei (CHN)
Team foil	China (CHN)	Italy (ITA)	Russia (RUS)
Individual épée	Yang Shaoqi (CHN)	Anna Garina (UKR)	Olga Aleksejeva (EST); Li Na (CHN)
Team épée	China (CHN)	Russia (RUS)	Ukraine (UKR)
Individual sabre	Ilaria Bianco (ITA)	Natalya Makeyeva (RUS)	Bao Yingying (CHN); Gioia Marzocca (ITA)
Team sabre	Russia (RUS)	China (CHN)	Italy (ITA)

== Medal table ==
* Host nation (China)

Rank	Nation	Gold	Silver	Bronze	Total
1	China*	5	3	3	11
2	Russia	3	2	5	10
3	Italy	2	5	4	11
4	France	2	0	1	3
5	Ukraine	0	2	1	3
6	Estonia	0	0	2	2
7	Spain	0	0	1	1
7	Switzerland	0	0	1	1
Totals (8 entries)		12	12	18	42
