= Fencing at the 1998 Asian Games – Women's team épée =

Women's team épée at the 1998 Asian Games
- Venue: Thammasat Gymnasium 4
- Date: 16 December 1998
- Nations: 8

Medalists
gold medal	China; Liang Qin, Liang Shuxian, Shen Weiwei, Yang Shaoqi
silver medal	South Korea; Kim Kyung-ja, Ko Jung-sun, Lee Keum-nam, Lee Myung-hee
bronze medal	Japan; Yuko Arai, Toshi Obata, Chieko Okada, Remi Shozui

The women's team épée competition at the 1998 Asian Games in Bangkok was held on 16 December 1998 at the Thammasat Gymnasium 4.

== Schedule ==
All times are Indochina Time (UTC+07:00)

Date	Time	Event
Wednesday, 16 December 1998	09:00	Preliminaries
Wednesday, 16 December 1998	16:00	Finals

== Results ==
Quarterfinals
1	China	45
8	Thailand	14
5	Kazakhstan	43
4	Indonesia	40
3	Japan	45
6	Hong Kong	43
7	Kyrgyzstan	20
2	South Korea	45

Semifinals
1	China	45
5	Kazakhstan	25
3	Japan	29
2	South Korea	39

Final
1	China	45
2	South Korea	27
Bronze medal match
5	Kazakhstan	33
3	Japan	45
