= Zhang Jie (fencer) =

Chinese fencer

Zhang Jie (Chinese: 张杰; pinyin: Zhāng Jié) is a Chinese fencer.

He participated in the 1999 World Fencing Championships, winning silver medal for team foil, and participated in the 2001 Summer Universiade and the 2002 Asian Games, winning gold medals for team foil.

== See also ==
- Fencing at the 2000 Summer Olympics
