= Fencing at the 2006 Asian Games – Women's individual sabre =

Women's individual sabre at the 2006 Asian Games
- Venue: Al-Arabi Indoor Hall
- Date: 9 December 2006
- Competitors: 14 from 8 nations

Medalists
gold medal	Tan Xue	China
silver medal	Zhao Yuanyuan	China
bronze medal	Kim Keum-hwa	South Korea
bronze medal	Chow Tsz Ki	Hong Kong

The women's individual sabre competition at the 2006 Asian Games in Doha was held on 9 December at the Al-Arabi Indoor Hall.

== Schedule ==
All times are Arabia Standard Time (UTC+03:00)

Date	Time	Event
Saturday, 9 December 2006	09:00	Round of pools
Saturday, 9 December 2006	10:30	Round of 16
Saturday, 9 December 2006	11:15	Quarterfinals
Saturday, 9 December 2006	18:00	Semifinals
Saturday, 9 December 2006	19:10	Gold medal match

== Results ==
=== Round of pools ===
==== Pool 1 ====
Athlete	CHN	KOR	JPN	HKG	VIE	PHI	KUW
Tan Xue (CHN)	—	5–2	3–5	5–4	5–1	5–3	5–1
Kim Keum-hwa (KOR)	2–5	—	5–1	5–2	5–3	5–1	5–0
Madoka Hisagae (JPN)	5–3	1–5	—	5–1	5–0	5–3	5–1
Au Yeung Wai Sum (HKG)	4–5	2–5	1–5	—	5–4	5–2	5–0
Trịnh Thị Lý (VIE)	1–5	3–5	0–5	4–5	—	5–3	5–0
Joanna Franquelli (PHI)	3–5	1–5	3–5	2–5	3–5	—	5–0
Dalal Al-Matar (KUW)	1–5	0–5	1–5	0–5	0–5	0–5	—

==== Pool 2 ====
Athlete	KOR	JPN	CHN	HKG	VIE	THA	KUW
Lee Shin-mi (KOR)	—	3–5	5–3	5–4	5–2	5–2	5–0
Sakura Kaneko (JPN)	5–3	—	3–5	3–5	3–5	5–2	5–0
Zhao Yuanyuan (CHN)	3–5	5–3	—	5–1	5–3	5–1	5–1
Chow Tsz Ki (HKG)	4–5	5–3	1–5	—	5–4	5–2	5–0
Nguyễn Thị Lệ Dung (VIE)	2–5	5–3	3–5	4–5	—	3–5	5–0
Nuanchan Phimkaeo (THA)	2–5	2–5	1–5	2–5	5–3	—	5–1
Fadha Al-Meaili (KUW)	0–5	0–5	1–5	0–5	0–5	1–5	—

==== Summary ====
Rank	Pool	Athlete	W	L	W/M	TD	TF
1	1	Kim Keum-hwa (KOR)	5	1	0.833	+15	27
2	2	Zhao Yuanyuan (CHN)	5	1	0.833	+14	28
3	1	Madoka Hisagae (JPN)	5	1	0.833	+13	26
4	2	Lee Shin-mi (KOR)	5	1	0.833	+12	28
4	1	Tan Xue (CHN)	5	1	0.833	+12	28
6	2	Chow Tsz Ki (HKG)	4	2	0.667	+6	25
7	2	Sakura Kaneko (JPN)	3	3	0.500	+4	24
8	1	Au Yeung Wai Sum (HKG)	3	3	0.500	+1	22
9	2	Nguyễn Thị Lệ Dung (VIE)	2	4	0.333	−1	22
10	1	Trịnh Thị Lý (VIE)	2	4	0.333	−5	18
11	2	Nuanchan Phimkaeo (THA)	2	4	0.333	−7	17
12	1	Joanna Franquelli (PHI)	1	5	0.167	−8	17
13	1	Dalal Al-Matar (KUW)	0	6	0.000	−28	2
13	2	Fadha Al-Meaili (KUW)	0	6	0.000	−28	2

=== Knockout round ===
Round of 16
9	Nguyễn Thị Lệ Dung (VIE)	6
8	Au Yeung Wai Sum (HKG)	15
11	Nuanchan Phimkaeo (THA)	3
6	Chow Tsz Ki (HKG)	15
7	Sakura Kaneko (JPN)	15
10	Trịnh Thị Lý (VIE)	11

Quarterfinals
1	Kim Keum-hwa (KOR)	15
8	Au Yeung Wai Sum (HKG)	7
5	Tan Xue (CHN)	15
4	Lee Shin-mi (KOR)	13
3	Midoka Hisagae (JPN)	13
6	Chow Tsz Ki (HKG)	15
7	Sakura Kaneko (JPN)	10
2	Zhao Yuanyuan (CHN)	15

Semifinals
1	Kim Keum-hwa (KOR)	7
5	Tan Xue (CHN)	15
6	Chow Tsz Ki (HKG)	12
2	Zhao Yuanyuan (CHN)	15

Gold medal match
5	Tan Xue (CHN)	15
2	Zhao Yuanyuan (CHN)	11

== Final standing ==
Rank	Athlete
1st place, gold medalist(s)	Tan Xue (CHN)
2nd place, silver medalist(s)	Zhao Yuanyuan (CHN)
3rd place, bronze medalist(s)	Kim Keum-hwa (KOR)
3rd place, bronze medalist(s)	Chow Tsz Ki (HKG)
5	Midoka Hisagae (JPN)
6	Lee Shin-mi (KOR)
7	Sakura Kaneko (JPN)
8	Au Yeung Wai Sum (HKG)
9	Nguyễn Thị Lệ Dung (VIE)
10	Trịnh Thị Lý (VIE)
11	Nuanchan Phimkaeo (THA)
12	Joanna Franquelli (PHI)
13	Dalal Al-Matar (KUW)
14	Fadha Al-Meaili (KUW)
