= Fencing at the 2003 Summer Universiade =

The fencing competition at the 2003 Summer Universiade was held in Daegu, South Korea.

== Medal overview ==
=== Men's events ===
Event	Gold	Silver	Bronze
Individual épée	Jean-Michel Lucenay (FRA)	Benjamin Steffen (SUI)	Christoph Marik (AUT); Igor Turchin (RUS)
Individual foil	Zhang Liangliang (CHN)	Ha Chang-Duk (KOR)	Yusuke Fukuda (JPN); Kyoya Ichikawa (JPN)
Individual sabre	Vladimir Lukashenko (UKR)	Oh Eun-Seok (KOR)	Tamás Decsi (HUN); Aleksey Frosin (RUS)
Team épée	Ukraine (UKR)	China (CHN)	Hungary (HUN)
Team foil	China (CHN)	South Korea (KOR)	Russia (RUS)
Team sabre	Russia (RUS)	Ukraine (UKR)	Spain (ESP)

=== Women's events ===
Event	Gold	Silver	Bronze
Individual épée	Kim Hee-Jeong (KOR)	Zhang Li (CHN)	Li Na (CHN); Luo Xiaojuan (CHN)
Individual foil	Nam Hyun-Hee (KOR)	Olga Lobyntseva (RUS)	Yevgeniya Lamonova (RUS); Jung Gil-ok (KOR)
Individual sabre	Tan Xue (CHN)	Yelena Nechayeva (RUS)	Bao Yingying (CHN); Natalya Makayeva (RUS)
Team épée	Russia (RUS)	China (CHN)	Estonia (EST)
Team foil	China (CHN)	South Korea (KOR)	Russia (RUS)
Team sabre	China (CHN)	Russia (RUS)	Japan (JPN)

== Medal table ==
Rank	Nation	Gold	Silver	Bronze	Total
1	China (CHN)	5	3	3	11
2	South Korea (KOR)	2	4	1	7
3	Russia (RUS)	2	3	6	11
4	Ukraine (UKR)	2	1	0	3
5	France (FRA)	1	0	0	1
6	Switzerland (SUI)	0	1	0	1
7	Japan (JPN)	0	0	3	3
8	Hungary (HUN)	0	0	2	2
9	Austria (AUT)	0	0	1	1
9	Estonia (EST)	0	0	1	1
9	Spain (ESP)	0	0	1	1
Totals (11 entries)		12	12	18	42
