= Almario Vizcayno =

Filipino athlete and chef

- Vizcayno coaching on February 10, 2007

Personal details
- Born: Almario Macario Vizcayno; November 4, 1981 (age 44) Quezon City, Manila, Philippines
- Spouse: Mabel Belite Vizcayno (m. 2007)
- Children: 3
- Education: University of Santo Tomas, Sergio Osmeña Sr. High School
- Occupation: Athlete, coach, chef, restaurant owner

Almario Vizcayno (born Almario Macario Vizcayno on November 4, 1981) is a Filipino athlete, coach, chef and restaurant owner. He is one of the famous athletes throughout the Philippines. He graduated from the University of Santo Tomas ( B.S. in Physical Education, 1999) and the Sergio Osmeña Sr. High School. Vizcayno is one of the veteran members of the Philippine National Fencing Team with Richard Gomez.

== Biography and career ==
Viscayno is the second child of Elfredo Viscayno and Virgina Viscayno; they live in Quezon City, Manila. He has three siblings, Oniong, Maylin and Ching. He attended his high-school years in Sergio Osmeña Sr. High School. He took up B.S. in Physical Education at the University of Santo Tomas, being a student and an athlete at the same time. He became one of the head fencing coaches at De La Salle University.

KeKots has Short order and Pulutan

== Awards ==
- Bronze Medalist- 1998 Asian Youth Fencing Championships, Foil Individual
- Gold Medalist- 22nd Southeast Asian Games, Men's Team Épée
- Gold Medalist- 24th Southeast Asian Games, Men's Team Épée
- Gold Medalist- 2009 Dayrit's Cup Fencing Tourney
- Gold Medalist- 2010 Dayrit's Cup Fencing Tourney
- Gold Medalist- 2011 Dayrit's Cup Fencing Tourney
- Gold Medalist- 1st LAMS Trophée, Open Men's Épée
- Gold Medalist- 2nd LAMS Trophée, Open Men's Épée
- Gold Medalist- 3rd LAMS Trophée, Open Men's Épée
