= Fencing at the 1998 Asian Games – Women's team foil =

Women's team foil at the 1998 Asian Games
- Venue: Thammasat Gymnasium 4
- Date: 14 December 1998
- Nations: 7

Medalists
gold medal	South Korea; Chun Mi-kyung, Lim Mi-kyung, Kim Dong-im, Lee Tae-hee
silver medal	China; Du Yunjie, Huang Minna, Wang Huifeng, Xiao Aihua
bronze medal	Japan; Yuko Arai, Masako Kobayashi, Chieko Okada, Miwako Shimada

The women's team foil competition at the 1998 Asian Games in Bangkok was held on 14 December 1998 at the Thammasat Gymnasium 4.

== Schedule ==
All times are Indochina Time (UTC+07:00)

Date	Time	Event
Monday, 14 December 1998	09:00	Preliminaries
Monday, 14 December 1998	16:00	Finals

== Results ==
Quarterfinals
5	Philippines	32
4	Kazakhstan	45
3	Japan	45
6	North Korea	36
7	Thailand	6
2	South Korea	45

Semifinals
1	China	45
4	Kazakhstan	29
3	Japan	30
2	South Korea	45

Final
1	China	38
2	South Korea	45
Bronze medal match
4	Kazakhstan	41
3	Japan	45
