= Fencing at the 1999 Summer Universiade =

Fencing events were contested at the 1999 Summer Universiade in Palma de Mallorca, Spain.

== Medal overview ==
=== Men's events ===
| Event | Gold | Silver | Bronze |
|---|---|---|---|
| Individual Foil | Rolando Tucker (CUB) | Michael Ludwig (AUT) | Slawomir Mocek (POL); Wang Haibin (CHN) |
| Team Foil | Cuba (CUB) | Poland (POL) | France (FRA) |
| Individual Épée | Davide Burroni (ITA) | Oleksandr Horbachuk (UKR) | Marcel Fischer (SUI); Bartłomiej Kurowski (POL) |
| Team Épée | France (FRA) | Poland (POL) | Austria (AUT) |
| Individual Sabre | Vadim Gutzeit (UKR) | Stanislav Pozdnyakov (RUS) | Sergey Sharikov (RUS); Jorge Pina (ESP) |
| Team Sabre | Hungary (HUN) | Spain (ESP) | Russia (RUS) |

=== Women's events ===
| Event | Gold | Silver | Bronze |
|---|---|---|---|
| Individual Foil | Valentina Vezzali (ITA) | Aida Mohamed (HUN) | Xiao Aihua (CHN); Svetlana Boyko (RUS) |
| Team Foil | Italy (ITA) | United States (USA) | Russia (RUS) |
| Individual Épée | Oxana Ermakova (RUS) | Natalya Gruzinskaya (UKR) | Kim Hee-Jeong (KOR); Tatiana Logunova (RUS) |
| Team Épée | Ukraine (UKR) | Hungary (HUN) | Cuba (CUB) |

== Medal table ==
* Host nation (Spain)

| Rank | Nation | Gold | Silver | Bronze | Total |
|---|---|---|---|---|---|
| 1 | Italy (ITA) | 3 | 0 | 0 | 3 |
| 2 | Ukraine (UKR) | 2 | 2 | 0 | 4 |
| 3 | Cuba (CUB) | 2 | 0 | 1 | 3 |
| 4 | Hungary (HUN) | 1 | 2 | 0 | 3 |
| 5 | Russia (RUS) | 1 | 1 | 5 | 7 |
| 6 | France (FRA) | 1 | 0 | 1 | 2 |
| 7 | Poland (POL) | 0 | 2 | 2 | 4 |
| 8 | Austria (AUT) | 0 | 1 | 1 | 2 |
| 8 | Spain (ESP)* | 0 | 1 | 1 | 2 |
| 10 | United States (USA) | 0 | 1 | 0 | 1 |
| 11 | China (CHN) | 0 | 0 | 2 | 2 |
| 12 | South Korea (KOR) | 0 | 0 | 1 | 1 |
| 12 | Switzerland (SUI) | 0 | 0 | 1 | 1 |
| Totals (13 entries) | | 10 | 10 | 15 | 35 |
