= Siriroj Rathprasert =

Thai fencer

Personal information
- Born: 8 November 1975 (age 50)

Sport
- Sport: Fencing

Siriroj Rathprasert (born 8 November 1975) is a Thai fencer. He competed in the individual épée event at the 2004 Summer Olympics.
