= Tsui Wan Yi =

Hong Kong fencer

Medal record

Women's Fencing

Asian Games
Bronze medal – third place	2006 Doha	Sabre Team

Tsui Wan Yi (born 11 September 1984) is a fencer from Hong Kong, who won a bronze medal at the 2006 Asian Games in the women's sabre team competition.
