= Kim Hee-jeong (fencer) =

South Korean fencer (born 1975)

Personal information
- Born: 1 January 1975 (age 51) Geumsan County, South Korea

Sport
- Sport: Fencing
- Coached by: Lee Sang-ki
Medal record
Representing South Korea
Summer Universiade
Gold medal – first place	2003 Daegu	Individual épée
Bronze medal – third place	1999 Palma de Mallorca	Individual épée
Asian Games
Gold medal – first place	2002 Busan	Individual épée
Gold medal – first place	2002 Busan	Team épée
Silver medal – second place	2002 Busan	Team sabre

Kim Hee-jeong (born 1 January 1975) is a South Korean fencer. She competed in the épée events at the 1996 and 2004 Summer Olympics.
