= Dong Guotao =

Chinese fencer

Personal information
- Nationality: Chinese
- Born: March 8, 1981 (age 44); Dandong, Liaoning
- Occupation: Athlete

Sport
- Sport: Fencing

Dong Guotao (born March 8, 1980, in Dandong, Liaoning, China) is a Chinese professional fencer specializing in épée. He represented China at the 2008 Summer Olympics in Beijing, where he placed fourth in the team competition.

== Major performances ==
- 2003 Asian Championships – 1st team/3rd individual;
- 2005 World Cup (Kuwait) – 6th individual

== See also ==
- China at the 2008 Summer Olympics
