= Kim Woon-sung =

South Korean fencer

Personal information
- Born: 22 July 1977 (age 48)

Sport
- Sport: Fencing

Korean name
- Hangul: 김운성
- RR: Gim Unseong
- MR: Kim Unsŏng

Kim Woon-sung (born 22 July 1977) is a South Korean fencer. He competed in the team foil event at the 2004 Summer Olympics.
