= Hyun Hee =

South Korean fencer (born 1976)

Medal record

Women's fencing

Representing South Korea

World Championships
Gold medal – first place	2002 Lisbon	Épée

Asian Games
Gold medal – first place	2002 Busan	Team épée
Silver medal – second place	2002 Busan	Épée

- Hyun Hee
- Hangul: 현희
- Hanja: 玄熙
- RR: Hyeon Hui
- MR: Hyŏn Hŭi

Hyun Hee (Korean: 현희; born October 4, 1976) is a retired South Korean épée fencer.

Hyun was born in Seongnam, Gyeonggi Province, South Korea.

At the 2002 FIE World Championships Hyun won the women's individual épée final match over Imke Duplitzer of Germany 15–11. She, along with Chinese fencer Tan Xue were the first Asian fencers to win gold medals at the World Championships. In that year, Hyun was named South Korean Sportswoman of the Year.

== Achievements ==
2002 World Fencing Championships, Individual épée
