= Huang Jialing =

Chinese fencer (born 1982)

Huang Jialing (born 3 August 1982 in Guangzhou) is a female Chinese foil fencer. She competed at the 2008 Summer Olympics.

== Major performances ==
- 1995 Guangzhou Sports School
- 2002 Guangdong Sports College
- 2005/2007 National Team

== See also ==
- China at the 2008 Summer Olympics
