= Chieko Sugawara =

Japanese fencer (born 1976)

Personal information
- Born: 15 August 1976 (age 50) Kesennuma, Japan
- Height: 162 cm (5 ft 4 in)
- Weight: 56 kg (123 lb)

Sport
- Sport: Fencing
- Event: Foil
- Club: Honvéd-LNX
Medal record
Women's fencing
Representing Japan
World Championships
Bronze medal – third place	2007 Saint Petersburg	Team foil
Asian Championships
Silver medal – second place	2001 Bangkok	Team foil
Bronze medal – third place	2007 Nantong	Individual foil
Bronze medal – third place	2007 Nantong	Team foil
Gold medal – first place	2008 Bangkok	Individual foil
Silver medal – second place	2008 Bangkok	Team foil
Bronze medal – third place	2012 Wakayama	Team foil
Asian Games
Bronze medal – third place	2002 Busan	Team foil
Bronze medal – third place	2006 Doha	Team foil

Chieko Sugawara (Japanese: 菅原 千恵子; born 15 August 1976) is a Japanese fencer. She represented Japan and competed in the women's individual foil events at the 2004, 2008 and 2012 Summer Olympics.
