= Wong Kam Kau =

Hong Kong fencer

Medal record

Men's Fencing

Asian Games
Bronze medal – third place	2006 Doha	Foil Team

Wong Kam Kau (born 13 September 1978) is a fencer from Hong Kong, China who won a bronze medal at the 2006 Asian Games in the men's foil team competition.
