= Akina Pau =

Hong Kong fencer

Medal record

Women's Fencing

Asian Games
Bronze medal – third place	2006 Doha	Epée Team

Pau Ming Wai Akina (born 14 October 1974) is a fencer from Hong Kong, China who won a bronze medal at the 2006 Asian Games in the women's sabre team competition.
