= Chen Jinyan =

Chinese fencer (born 1988)

- Born: January 22, 1988 (age 37); Guangdong, China
- Height: 1.66 m (5 ft 5 in)
- Weight: 65 kg (143 lb)

Sport
- Country: China

Chen Jinyan (born January 22, 1988) is a Chinese fencer. At the 2012 Summer Olympics, she competed in the Women's foil, defeated 6-15 in the third round by Valentina Vezzali of Italy.
