= Ku Kyo-dong =

South Korean fencer

Personal information
- Born: 3 September 1972 (age 53)

Sport
- Sport: Fencing

Korean name
- Hangul: 구교동
- Hanja: 具敎東
- RR: Gu Gyodong
- MR: Ku Kyodong

Ku Kyo-dong (具敎東, born 3 September 1972) is a South Korean fencer. He competed in the team épée events at the 1992 Summer Olympics.

== Results ==
In the 1992 Summer Olympic Games. Gu had a record of 0-0-2, competing against Jerri Bergström and Péter Vánky. Gu lost 1-5 in his bout with Bergström, and lost 3-5 in his bout with Vánky. In the 1994 and 2002 Asian Games, Gu competed for South Korea in the Team Épée event, earning a bronze medal. In the 2002 World Fencing Championships in Lisbon, Gu earned a bronze medal for South Korea in Team Épée.
