= Lee Shin-mi =

South Korean fencer

Personal information
- Born: 15 May 1983 (age 43)

Sport
- Country: South Korea
- Sport: Fencing
- Event: Sabre
Medal record
Women's fencing
Asian Games
Gold medal – first place	2002 Busan	Sabre
Silver medal – second place	2002 Busan	Team sabre
Silver medal – second place	2006 Doha	Team sabre
Universiade
Gold medal – first place	2007 Bangkok	Sabre
Gold medal – first place	2007 Bangkok	Team sabre

Lee Shin-mi (born 15 May 1983) is a South Korean fencer. She competed in the women's individual sabre events at the 2004 and 2008 Summer Olympics.
