= Wang Haibin =

Chinese fencer (born 1973)

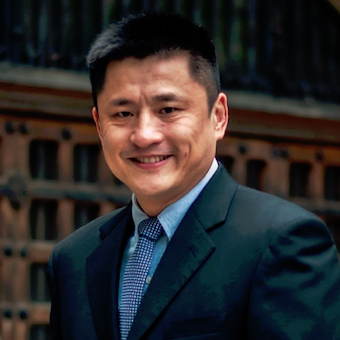
- Wang in 2019

Personal information
- Born: 27 December 1973 (age 52) Nanjing, Jiangsu, China

Sport
- Sport: Fencing
Medal record
Men's fencing
Representing China
Olympic Games
Silver medal – second place	2000 Sydney	Team foil
Silver medal – second place	2004 Athens	Team foil
World Championships
Silver medal – second place	1999 Seoul	Team foil
Silver medal – second place	2003 Havana	Team foil
Bronze medal – third place	1994 Buffalo	Team foil
Bronze medal – third place	1997 Cape Town	Individual foil
Summer Universiade
Gold medal – first place	2001 Beijing	Team foil
Silver medal – second place	1995 Fukuoka	Team foil
Silver medal – second place	2001 Beijing	Individual foil
Bronze medal – third place	1993 Buffalo	Team foil
Bronze medal – third place	1997 Catania	Individual foil
Bronze medal – third place	1997 Catania	Team foil
Bronze medal – third place	1999 Palma de Mallorca	Individual foil
Asian Games
Gold medal – first place	1998 Bangkok	Individual foil
Gold medal – first place	1998 Bangkok	Team foil
Gold medal – first place	2002 Busan	Individual foil
Gold medal – first place	2002 Busan	Team foil
Silver medal – second place	1994 Hiroshima	Team foil

Wang Haibin (Chinese: 王海滨; pinyin: Wáng Hǎibīn; born 27 December 1973 in Nanjing, Jiangsu) is Chairman of the China Fencing Association and Head Coach of the China National Fencing Team. In November 2021 in Lausanne, he was elected to a 3-year term on the executive committee of the International Fencing Federation (FIE). Earlier in his career, he was an internationally ranked Chinese foil fencer. He competed at the 1992 Summer Olympics, 1996 Summer Olympics, 2000 Summer Olympics and 2004 Summer Olympics.

He first competed at the Olympics in 1992, where he was eliminated in the second round of the Olympic foil tournament and finished tenth with the Chinese foil team in the team event.

In 1996, he was eliminated in the round of 16 of the Olympic foil tournament and finished ninth with the Chinese foil team in the team event.

Four years later in Sydney, he won the silver medal as part of the Chinese foil team. In the 2000 Olympic foil tournament he was eliminated in the round of 16 again.

In 2004 in Athens, he won the silver medal again as a member of the Chinese foil team. In the individual Olympic foil tournament he was eliminated in the first round again.

From 2005 to 2016, Wang served as the head men's foil coach for China's National Fencing Team, during which time he helped Lei Sheng win a gold medal at the 2012 London Olympics. From 2016 to 2021, Wang coached in the United States in New Haven, CT, where he helped lead a resurgence of the Yale University Men's and Women's Fencing Teams.
