= Zhang Lei (fencer) =

Chinese fencer (born 1979)

Personal information
- Born: 23 March 1979 (age 47)

Sport
- Sport: Fencing

Zhang Lei (born 23 March 1979 in Nanjing, Jiangsu) is a female Chinese foil fencer. She competed at the 2000 and 2008 Summer Olympics.

== Major performances ==
- 2002 Asian Games – 1st foil;
- 2008 World Cup Germany – 1st foil

== See also ==
- China at the 2000 Summer Olympics
- China at the 2008 Summer Olympics
