= Seo Mi-jung =

South Korean fencer (born 1980)

Medal record

Representing South Korea

Women's Fencing

World Championships
Gold medal – first place	2005 Leipzig	Team foil
Bronze medal – third place	2006 Turin	Team foil
Bronze medal – third place	2010 Paris	Team foil

Asian Games
Gold medal – first place	2002 Busan	Team foil
Gold medal – first place	2006 Doha	Team foil
Gold medal – first place	2010 Guangzhou	Team foil
Silver medal – second place	2006 Doha	Foil

Seo Mi-Jung (Korean: 서미정; born 10 February 1980) is a South Korean foil fencer.

Seo won the bronze medal in the foil team event at the 2006 World Fencing Championships after beating Poland in the bronze medal match. She accomplished this with her teammates Jeon Hee-Sok, Jung Gil-Ok and Nam Hyun-Hee. She also competed at the 2000 Summer Olympics in the individual foil event.

== Achievements ==
2005 World Fencing Championships, team foil
2006 World Fencing Championships, team foil
