= Wu Hanxiong =

Chinese fencer

Personal information
- Born: January 21, 1981 (age 45) Shantou, Guangdong

Sport
- Sport: Fencing
Medal record
Men's fencing
Representing China
Olympic Games
Silver medal – second place	2004 Athens	team foil

Wu Hanxiong (simplified Chinese: 吴汉雄; traditional Chinese: 吳漢雄; pinyin: Wú Hànxióng; Jyutping: Ng4 Hon3 Hung4; born January 21, 1981, in Shantou, Guangdong) is a male Chinese foil fencer who competed in the 2004 Summer Olympics.

In 2004 he won the silver medal with the Chinese foil team. In the individual Olympic foil tournament he was eliminated in the quarterfinals.
