= Yang Roy-sung =

South Korean fencer

Personal information
- Nationality: South Korea
- Born: 21 April 1973 (age 53)

Korean name
- Hangul: 양뢰성
- Hanja: 梁雷聲
- RR: Yang Roeseong
- MR: Yang Roesŏng

Sport
- Sport: Fencing

Yang Roy-sung (Korean: 양뢰성; born 21 April 1973) is a South Korean fencer. He competed in the individual and team épée events at the 1996 and 2000 Summer Olympics.
