= Meng Jie (fencer) =

Chinese fencer

Personal information
- Born: 28 July 1976 (age 49) Shanghai, China

Sport
- Sport: Fencing

Meng Jie (born 28 July 1976) is a Chinese fencer. She competed in the foil events at the 2000 and 2004 Summer Olympics.
