= Xie Yongjun =

Chinese fencer

Personal information
- Born: 5 February 1980 (age 46) Liaoning, China

Sport
- Sport: Fencing

Xie Yongjun (born 5 February 1980) is a Chinese fencer. He competed in the individual and team épée events at the 2004 Summer Olympics.
