= Shen Weiwei =

Chinese fencer (born 1980)

Personal information
- Born: 31 July 1980 (age 45) Nantong, China

Sport
- Sport: Fencing

Shen Weiwei (born 31 July 1980) is a Chinese fencer. She competed in the women's individual and team épée events at the 2004 Summer Olympics.
