= Naoto Okazaki =

Japanese fencer (born 1969)

Personal information
- Born: 2 July 1969 (age 57) Kanagawa, Japan

Sport
- Sport: Fencing

Naoto Okazaki (岡崎 直人, Okazaki Naoto; born 2 July 1969) is a Japanese fencer. He competed in the individual foil event at the 2000 Summer Olympics.
