= Lee Sang-yup =

South Korean fencer (born 1972)

Personal information
- Born: 2 October 1972 (age 53) Busan, South Korea

Sport
- Sport: Fencing
- Club: Battle Born Fencing Club (BBFC)
Medal record
Men's fencing
Representing South Korea
World Championships
Bronze medal – third place	1994 Athens	Épée

Lee Sang-yup (Korean: 이상엽; Hanja: 李相燁; born 2 October 1972) is a South Korean fencer. He competed in the épée events at the 1992, 2000 and 2004 Summer Olympics.
