= Zhao Gang (fencer) =

Chinese fencer

Personal information
- Born: 4 January 1971 (age 55) Liaoning, China

Sport
- Sport: Fencing

Zhao Gang (born 4 January 1971) is a Chinese fencer. He competed in the épée events at the 1996, 2000 and 2004 Summer Olympics.
