= Wang Lei (fencer) =

Chinese fencer

Personal information
- Born: March 20, 1981 (age 45) Shanghai, China

Sport
- Sport: Fencing
Medal record
Men's fencing
Representing China
Olympic Games
Silver medal – second place	2004 Athens	Épée
World Championships
Gold medal – first place	2006 Turin	Épée

Wang Lei (Chinese: 王磊; pinyin: Wáng Lěi; born March 20, 1981, in Shanghai) is a Chinese épée fencer.

Wang won the gold medal at the épée 2006 World Fencing Championships after beating Joaquim Videira 6-5 in the final. He also won the silver medal in the 2004 Summer Olympics.
