= Zhang Ying (fencer) =

Chinese fencer (born 1982)

Personal information
- Born: 9 February 1982 (age 44) Shanghai, China

Sport
- Sport: Fencing

Zhang Ying (born 9 February 1982) is a Chinese fencer. She competed in the individual sabre event at the 2004 Summer Olympics.
