= Kim Young-ho (fencer) =

South Korean fencer

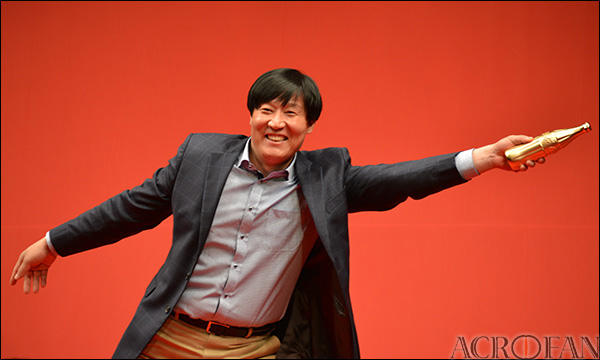

Personal information
- Born: 9 April 1971 (age 55) Nonsan, Chungcheongnam-do, South Korea

Sport
- Sport: Fencing
- Event: Foil

Korean name
- Hangul: 김영호
- Hanja: 金永浩
- RR: Gim Yeongho
- MR: Kim Yŏngho
Medal record
Men's fencing
Representing South Korea
Olympic Games
Gold medal – first place	2000 Sydney	Foil
World Championships
Silver medal – second place	1997 Cape Town	Foil
Bronze medal – third place	1998 La Chaux-de-Fonds	Team foil
Bronze medal – third place	1999 Seoul	Foil

Kim Young-ho (born April 9, 1971 in Nonsan, Chungcheongnam-do, South Korea) is a South Korean foil fencer.

At the 2000 Olympics in Sydney, he won the gold medal in individual foil, defeating Ralf Bissdorf of Germany in the final. He became the first Olympic Champion in fencing from Korea, and the first Asian man to win an Olympic Gold medal in fencing.

At the 1997 World Championships he had perhaps one of the most heroic losses in top level fencing. With approximately 2 minutes left in the final period, Kim was down 11-3 to Sergei Golubitsky of Ukraine. As direct elimination fencing bouts go to 15 touches, most fencers would presume Kim was about done and was fencing for pride. 8 touches later Kim had tied the score.

He and Golubitsky (as Sergei stated on his "Golden Bouts" tape, "and now the nightmare begins....the comeback of Kim") traded touches until Kim finally lost 15–14. At la belle (tied for the last touch, 14-14), Kim almost pulled the win out, but his attack failed to register (although he had struck valid target) and Golubitsky dodged a bullet, allowing him the chance to win the bout.
