= Yuko Arai =

Japanese fencer (born 1973)

Personal information
- Born: 20 September 1973 (age 52) Gifu, Gifu, Japan

Sport
- Sport: Fencing

Yuko Arai (born 20 September 1973) is a Japanese fencer. She competed in the women's individual and team épée events at the 1996 Summer Olympics and the individual foil event at the 2000 Summer Olympics.
