= Madoka Hisagae =

Japanese fencer (born 1979)

Personal information
- Born: 11 January 1979 (age 47) Kumamoto, Japan

Sport
- Sport: Fencing

Madoka Hisagae (久枝 円, Hisagae Madoka; born 11 January 1979) is a Japanese fencer. She competed in the women's individual sabre events at the 2004 and 2008 Summer Olympics.
