= Sergey Shabalin =

Kazakhstani fencer (born 1971)

Personal information
- Born: 24 August 1971 (age 54) Semey, Kazakh SSR, Soviet Union

Sport
- Sport: Fencing

Sergey Shabalin (born 24 August 1971) is a Kazakhstani fencer. He competed in the individual épée event at the 2000 Summer Olympics.
