= Fencing at the 2014 Asian Games =

- Venue: Goyang Gymnasium
- Dates: 20–25 September 2014
- Competitors: 238 from 25 nations

Fencing at the 2014 Asian Games was held in Goyang Gymnasium, Goyang, South Korea from September 20 to 25, 2014.

== Schedule ==
P	Pools	F	Finals

Event↓/Date →	20th Sat		21st Sun		22nd Mon		23rd Tue	24th Wed	25th Thu
Men's individual épée	P	F							
Men's team épée							F		
Men's individual foil					P	F			
Men's team foil									F
Men's individual sabre			P	F					
Men's team sabre								F	
Women's individual épée					P	F			
Women's team épée									F
Women's individual foil			P	F					
Women's team foil								F	
Women's individual sabre	P	F							
Women's team sabre							F		

== Medalists ==
=== Men ===
Event	Gold	Silver	Bronze
Individual épée	Jung Jin-sun; South Korea	Park Kyoung-doo; South Korea	Nguyễn Tiến Nhật; Vietnam
Individual épée	Jung Jin-sun; South Korea	Park Kyoung-doo; South Korea	Lim Wei Wen; Singapore
Team épée	South Korea; Jung Jin-sun; Kweon Young-jun; Park Kyoung-doo; Park Sang-young	Japan; Kazuyasu Minobe; Keisuke Sakamoto; Masaru Yamada	Vietnam; Nguyễn Phước Đến; Nguyễn Tiến Nhật; Phạm Hùng Dương; Trương Trần Nhật Minh
Team épée	South Korea; Jung Jin-sun; Kweon Young-jun; Park Kyoung-doo; Park Sang-young	Japan; Kazuyasu Minobe; Keisuke Sakamoto; Masaru Yamada	Kazakhstan; Dmitriy Alexanin; Elmir Alimzhanov; Dmitriy Gryaznov; Ruslan Kurbanov
Individual foil	Ma Jianfei; China	Heo Jun; South Korea	Chen Haiwei; China
Individual foil	Ma Jianfei; China	Heo Jun; South Korea	Yuki Ota; Japan
Team foil	Japan; Kenta Chida; Daiki Fujino; Ryo Miyake; Yuki Ota	China; Chen Haiwei; Lei Sheng; Li Chen; Ma Jianfei	Hong Kong; Cheung Ka Long; Cheung Siu Lun; Nicholas Choi; Yeung Chi Ka
Team foil	Japan; Kenta Chida; Daiki Fujino; Ryo Miyake; Yuki Ota	China; Chen Haiwei; Lei Sheng; Li Chen; Ma Jianfei	South Korea; Heo Jun; Kim Hyo-gon; Kim Min-kyu; Son Young-ki
Individual sabre	Gu Bon-gil; South Korea	Kim Jung-hwan; South Korea	Lam Hin Chung; Hong Kong
Individual sabre	Gu Bon-gil; South Korea	Kim Jung-hwan; South Korea	Sun Wei; China
Team sabre	South Korea; Gu Bon-gil; Kim Jung-hwan; Oh Eun-seok; Won Woo-young	Iran; Mojtaba Abedini; Farzad Baher; Ali Pakdaman; Mohammad Rahbari	Hong Kong; Cyrus Chang; Lam Hin Chung; Low Ho Tin; Yan Hon Pan
Team sabre	South Korea; Gu Bon-gil; Kim Jung-hwan; Oh Eun-seok; Won Woo-young	Iran; Mojtaba Abedini; Farzad Baher; Ali Pakdaman; Mohammad Rahbari	China; Fang Xin; Sun Wei; Tan Sheng; Xu Yingming

=== Women ===
Event	Gold	Silver	Bronze
Individual épée	Sun Yujie; China	Shin A-lam; South Korea	Vivian Kong; Hong Kong
Individual épée	Sun Yujie; China	Shin A-lam; South Korea	Choi In-jeong; South Korea
Team épée	China; Hao Jialu; Sun Yiwen; Sun Yujie; Xu Anqi	South Korea; Choi Eun-sook; Choi In-jeong; Kim Myoung-sun; Shin A-lam	Japan; Rie Ohashi; Ayaka Shimookawa; Ayumi Yamada
Team épée	China; Hao Jialu; Sun Yiwen; Sun Yujie; Xu Anqi	South Korea; Choi Eun-sook; Choi In-jeong; Kim Myoung-sun; Shin A-lam	Hong Kong; Chu Ka Mong; Vivian Kong; Coco Lin; Yeung Chui Ling
Individual foil	Jeon Hee-sook; South Korea	Le Huilin; China	Lin Po Heung; Hong Kong
Individual foil	Jeon Hee-sook; South Korea	Le Huilin; China	Nam Hyun-hee; South Korea
Team foil	South Korea; Jeon Hee-sook; Kim Mi-na; Nam Hyun-hee; Oh Ha-na	China; Chen Bingbing; Le Huilin; Liu Yongshi; Wang Chen	Japan; Karin Miyawaki; Shiho Nishioka; Haruka Yanaoka
Team foil	South Korea; Jeon Hee-sook; Kim Mi-na; Nam Hyun-hee; Oh Ha-na	China; Chen Bingbing; Le Huilin; Liu Yongshi; Wang Chen	Hong Kong; Cheng Hiu Lam; Kimberley Cheung; Lin Po Heung; Liu Yan Wai
Individual sabre	Lee Ra-jin; South Korea	Kim Ji-yeon; South Korea	Li Fei; China
Individual sabre	Lee Ra-jin; South Korea	Kim Ji-yeon; South Korea	Shen Chen; China
Team sabre	South Korea; Hwang Seon-a; Kim Ji-yeon; Lee Ra-jin; Yoon Ji-su	China; Li Fei; Qian Jiarui; Shen Chen; Yu Xinting	Hong Kong; Au Sin Ying; Karen Chang; Jenny Ho; Lam Hin Wai
Team sabre	South Korea; Hwang Seon-a; Kim Ji-yeon; Lee Ra-jin; Yoon Ji-su	China; Li Fei; Qian Jiarui; Shen Chen; Yu Xinting	Kazakhstan; Diana Pamansha; Tamara Pochekutova; Tatyana Prikhodko; Yuliya Zhivitsa

== Medal table ==
Rank	Nation	Gold	Silver	Bronze	Total
1	South Korea (KOR)	8	6	3	17
2	China (CHN)	3	4	5	12
3	Japan (JPN)	1	1	3	5
4	Iran (IRI)	0	1	0	1
5	Hong Kong (HKG)	0	0	8	8
6	Kazakhstan (KAZ)	0	0	2	2
6	Vietnam (VIE)	0	0	2	2
8	Singapore (SIN)	0	0	1	1
Totals (8 entries)		12	12	24	48

== Participating nations ==
A total of 238 athletes from 25 nations competed in fencing at the 2014 Asian Games:

- Brunei (1)
- China (24)
- Chinese Taipei (4)
- Hong Kong (24)
- Indonesia (3)
- Iran (8)
- Japan (20)
- Kazakhstan (16)
- Kuwait (12)
- Kyrgyzstan (4)
- Lebanon (2)
- Macau (8)
- Mongolia (6)
- Nepal (4)
- Palestine (2)
- Philippines (2)
- Qatar (19)
- Saudi Arabia (12)
- Singapore (16)
- South Korea (24)
- Thailand (6)
- United Arab Emirates (2)
- Uzbekistan (6)
- Vietnam (12)
- Yemen (1)
