= Men's sabre at the 2014 World Fencing Championships =

The Men's sabre event of the 2014 World Fencing Championships was held on 18 July 2014. The qualification was held on 15 July 2014.

== Medalists ==
Gold	Nikolay Kovalev (RUS)
Silver	Gu Bon-gil (KOR)
Bronze	Tiberiu Dolniceanu (ROU)
Bronze	Aleksey Yakimenko (RUS)

== Draw ==
=== Finals ===
Semi-finals
(Russia) Nikolay Kovalev	15
(Romania) Tiberiu Dolniceanu	9
(South Korea) Gu Bon-gil	15
(Russia) Aleksey Yakimenko	12

Final
(Russia) Nikolay Kovalev	15
(South Korea) Gu Bon-gil	7

=== Top half ===
==== Section 1 ====
Round of 64
1	(South Korea) Kim Jung-hwan	15
64	(Egypt) Ahmed Amr	9
33	(Belgium) Seppe van Holsbeke	9
32	(Hungary) Tamás Decsi	15
17	(Belarus) Aliaksandr Buikevich	15
48	(Hong Kong) Low Ho Tin	8
49	(United States) Benjamin Igoe	6
16	(Russia) Nikolay Kovalev	15
9	(Italy) Aldo Montano	15
56	(Ukraine) Dmytro Boiko	6
41	(Iran) Mojtaba Abedini	15
24	(United Kingdom) James Honeybone	10
25	(France) Vincent Anstett	15
40	(Japan) Tomohiro Shimamura	13
57	(Vietnam) Vũ Thành An	3
8	(Italy) Luigi Samele	15

Round of 32
1	(South Korea) Kim Jung-hwan	15
32	(Hungary) Tamás Decsi	3
17	(Belarus) Aliaksandr Buikevich	11
16	(Russia) Nikolay Kovalev	15
9	(Italy) Aldo Montano	15
41	(Iran) Mojtaba Abedini	8
25	(France) Vincent Anstett	15
8	(Italy) Luigi Samele	11

Round of 16
1	(South Korea) Kim Jung-hwan	12
16	(Russia) Nikolay Kovalev	15
9	(Italy) Aldo Montano	15
25	(France) Vincent Anstett	5

Quarterfinals
16	(Russia) Nikolay Kovalev	15
9	(Italy) Aldo Montano	12

==== Section 2 ====
Round of 64
5	(Romania) Tiberiu Dolniceanu	15
60	(Venezuela) José Quintero	6
37	(Germany) Matyas Szabo	15
28	(United States) Eli Dershwitz	14
21	(Kazakhstan) Ilya Mokretcov	15
44	(Poland) Adam Skrodzki	8
53	(South Korea) Oh Eun-seok	15
12	(Hungary) Csanád Gémesi	11
13	(Germany) Max Hartung	15
52	(Ukraine) Yevgeniy Statsenko	5
45	(China) Tan Sheng	12
20	(Ukraine) Dmytro Pundyk	15
29	(Iran) Farzad Baher	11
36	(France) Boladé Apithy	15
61	(France) Maxence Lambert	11
4	(Italy) Enrico Berrè	15

Round of 32
5	(Romania) Tiberiu Dolniceanu	15
37	(Germany) Matyas Szabo	10
21	(Kazakhstan) Ilya Mokretcov	6
53	(South Korea) Oh Eun-seok	15
13	(Germany) Max Hartung	15
20	(Ukraine) Dmytro Pundyk	14
36	(France) Boladé Apithy	10
4	(Italy) Enrico Berrè	15

Round of 16
5	(Romania) Tiberiu Dolniceanu	15
53	(South Korea) Oh Eun-seok	13
13	(Germany) Max Hartung	15
4	(Italy) Enrico Berrè	11

Quarterfinals
5	(Romania) Tiberiu Dolniceanu	15
13	(Germany) Max Hartung	5

=== Bottom half ===
==== Section 3 ====
Round of 64
3	(Hungary) Áron Szilágyi	15
62	(Austria) Mathias Willau	6
35	(Georgia (country)) Sandro Bazadze	15
30	(Hong Kong) Chang Chi Hin Cyrus	13
19	(Germany) Nicolas Limbach	15
46	(Poland) Jacub Ocinski	6
51	(Brazil) Renzo Agresta	11
14	(Russia) Kamil Ibragimov	15
11	(United States) Daryl Homer	15
54	(Canada) Shaul Gordon	11
43	(Romania) Alin Badea	15
22	(Argentina) Ricardo Bustamante	5
27	(Germany) Benedikt Wagner	15
38	(Spain) Fernando Casares	14
59	(China) Sun Wei	8
6	(South Korea) Gu Bon-gil	15

Round of 32
3	(Hungary) Áron Szilágyi	15
35	(Georgia (country)) Sandro Bazadze	14
19	(Germany) Nicolas Limbach	15
14	(Russia) Kamil Ibragimov	13
11	(United States) Daryl Homer	14
43	(Romania) Alin Badea	15
27	(Germany) Benedikt Wagner	12
6	(South Korea) Gu Bon-gil	15

Round of 16
3	(Hungary) Áron Szilágyi	15
19	(Germany) Nicolas Limbach	13
43	(Romania) Alin Badea	7
6	(South Korea) Gu Bon-gil	15

Quarterfinals
3	(Hungary) Áron Szilágyi	10
6	(South Korea) Gu Bon-gil	15

==== Section 4 ====
Round of 64
7	(Italy) Diego Occhiuzzi	15
58	(Spain) Marco Miguel García	12
39	(Egypt) Ziad Elsissy	12
26	(United States) Jeff Spear	15
23	(Ukraine) Andriy Yagodka	15
42	(Venezuela) Eliecer Romero	7
55	(Hungary) András Szatmári	10
10	(Russia) Aleksey Yakimenko	15
15	(France) Nicolas Rousset	15
50	(Venezuela) Abraham Rodriguez	3
47	(Mexico) Hector Florencia	8
18	(Belarus) Valery Pryiemka	15
31	(South Korea) Won Woo-young	15
34	(Iran) Ali Pakdaman	10
63	(Romania) Iulian Teodosiu	8
2	(Russia) Veniamin Reshetnikov	15

Round of 32
7	(Italy) Diego Occhiuzzi	15
26	(United States) Jeff Spear	14
23	(Ukraine) Andriy Yagodka	12
10	(Russia) Aleksey Yakimenko	15
15	(France) Nicolas Rousset	15
18	(Belarus) Valery Pryiemka	11
31	(South Korea) Won Woo-young	15
2	(Russia) Veniamin Reshetnikov	12

Round of 16
7	(Italy) Diego Occhiuzzi	6
10	(Russia) Aleksey Yakimenko	15
15	(France) Nicolas Rousset	6
31	(South Korea) Won Woo-young	15

Quarterfinals
10	(Russia) Aleksey Yakimenko	15
31	(South Korea) Won Woo-young	14

== Final classification ==
Rank	Athlete	Nation
1st place, gold medalist(s)	Nikolay Kovalev	Russia
2nd place, silver medalist(s)	Gu Bon-gil	South Korea
3rd place, bronze medalist(s)	Tiberiu Dolniceanu	Romania
3rd place, bronze medalist(s)	Aleksey Yakimenko	Russia
5	Áron Szilágyi	Hungary
6	Aldo Montano	Italy
7	Max Hartung	Germany
8	Won Woo-young	South Korea
9	Kim Jung-hwan	South Korea
10	Enrico Berrè	Italy
11	Diego Occhiuzzi	Italy
12	Nicolas Rousset	France
13	Nicolas Limbach	Germany
14	Vincent Anstett	France
15	Alin Badea	Romania
16	Oh Eun-Seok	South Korea
17	Veniamin Reshetnikov	Russia
18	Luigi Samele	Italy
19	Daryl Homer	United States
20	Kamil Ibragimov	Russia
21	Aliaksandr Buikevich	Belarus
22	Valery Pryiemka	Belarus
22	Dmytro Pundyk	Ukraine
24	Ilya Mokretcov	Kazakhstan
25	Andriy Yagodka	Ukraine
26	Jeff Spear	United States
27	Benedikt Wagner	Germany
28	Tamás Decsi	Hungary
29	Sandro Bazadze	Georgia
30	Boladé Apithy	France
31	Matyas Szabo	Germany
32	Mojtaba Abedini	Iran
33	Csanád Gémesi	Hungary
34	Ricardo Alberto Bustamante	Argentina
35	James Honeybone	Great Britain
36	Eli Dershwitz	United States
37	Farzad Baher Aresbaran	Iran
38	Chang Chi Hin Cyrus	Hong Kong
39	Seppe Van Holsbeke	Belgium
40	Ali Pakdaman	Iran
41	Fernando Casares	Spain
42	Ziad Elsissy	Egypt
43	Tomohiro Shimamura	Japan
44	Eliecer Romero	Venezuela
45	Adam Skrodzki	Poland
46	Tan Sheng	China
47	Jakub Ocinski	Poland
48	Hector Florencia	Mexico
49	Low Ho Tin	Hong Kong
50	Benjamin Igoe	United States
51	Abraham Rodriguez	Venezuela
52	Renzo Agresta	Brazil
53	Yevgeniy Statsenko	Ukraine
54	Shaul Gordon	Canada
55	András Szatmári	Hungary
56	Dmytro Boiko	Ukraine
57	Vũ Thành An	Vietnam
58	Marco García Miguel	Spain
59	Sun Wei	China
60	José Quintero	Venezuela
60	Maxence Lambert	France
62	Mathias Willau	Austria
63	Iulian Teodosiu	Romania
64	Ahmed Amr	Egypt
65	Diego de la Fuente	Spain
66	Pablo Moreno	Spain
67	Lam Hin Chung	Hong Kong
68	Mikołaj Grzegorek	Poland
69	Curtis Miller	Great Britain
70	Hector David Castro Linares	Dominican Republic
71	Pascual Maria Di Tella	Argentina
72	Soji Aiyenuro	Great Britain
73	Hernan Jansen Brito	Venezuela
74	Alexander Crutchett	Great Britain
75	Julian Ayala	Mexico
75	Xu Yingming	China
77	Philippe Beaudry	Canada
78	Aliaksei Likhacheuski	Belarus
79	Stefano Ivan Lucchetti	Argentina
80	Ciprian Gălățanu	Romania
81	Fares Arfa	Canada
82	Hamzah Habeed M Al-Mohammedawi	Iraq
83	Choy Yu Yong	Singapore
84	Kenta Tokunan	Japan
85	Yan Hon Pan	Hong Kong
86	Saba Sulamanidze	Georgia
87	Aly Adel	Egypt
88	Adrian Acuna Ramirez	Mexico
89	Ruangrit Haekerd	Thailand
90	Choy Yu Yong	Singapore
91	Tanaka Shun	Japan
91	Ryo Miyayama	Japan
93	Jan Hoschna	Czech Republic
94	Zhanserik Turlybekov	Kazakhstan
95	Fang Xin	China
96	Alexandre Woog	Israel
97	Teddy Weller	U.S. Virgin Islands
98	Alexei Romanovitch	Belarus
99	Beka Bazadze	Georgia
100	Mikheil Mardaleishvili	Georgia
101	Yemi Geoffrey Apithy	Benin
102	Eduardo Lara	Mexico
103	Yevgeni Frolov	Kazakhstan
104	Rafael Wester Reyes	Dominican Republic
105	Willian Zeytounlian	Brazil
106	David Wei Ren Chan	Singapore
107	Moustapha Diagne	Senegal
108	Stephen Concannon	Ireland
108	Tywilliam Guzenski	Brazil
110	Adam Wilcock	Australia
111	Tseng Lin Fang	Singapore
112	Haitham Al-Bazooni	Iraq
113	Israel Vásquez	Chile
114	Guido Eduardo Mulero	Argentina
115	Mohab Samer	Egypt
116	Yevgeni Konovalov	Uzbekistan
117	Zak Leonhard	Australia
118	Jose Ricardo Chafloque Alvan	Peru
119	Rouchdy Assimi Imorou	Venezuela
120	Cesar Adalid Diaz Rodriguez	Honduras
121	Joseph Maluleke	South Africa
122	Sagar Shrestha	Nepal
999	Keny Limpias Limpias Ribera	Bolivia
999	Dautry Landry Massamba Malanda	Congo
999	Glodie Bingoto Makanya	DR Congo
