= 2014 Asian Fencing Championships =

- Host city: (South Korea) Suwon, Korea
- Dates: 2–7 July 2014
- Main venue: Suwon Gymnasium

The 2014 Asian Fencing Championships were held in Suwon, South Korea from 2 to 7 July 2014 at the Suwon Gymnasium.

== Medal summary ==
=== Men ===
| Event | Gold | Silver | Bronze |
|---|---|---|---|
| Individual épée | Jung Jin-sun; South Korea | Keisuke Sakamoto; Japan | Park Kyoung-doo; South Korea |
| Individual épée | Jung Jin-sun; South Korea | Keisuke Sakamoto; Japan | Roman Aleksandrov; Uzbekistan |
| Team épée | South Korea; Jung Jin-sun; Kweon Young-jun; Park Kyoung-doo; Park Sang-young | China; Dong Chao; Jiao Yunlong; Li Guojie; Zhang Chengjie | Japan; Kazuyasu Minobe; Keisuke Sakamoto; Satoru Uyama; Masaru Yamada |
| Team épée | South Korea; Jung Jin-sun; Kweon Young-jun; Park Kyoung-doo; Park Sang-young | China; Dong Chao; Jiao Yunlong; Li Guojie; Zhang Chengjie | Kyrgyzstan; Aleksandr Chernykh; Mikhail Ivanov; Evgeny Naumkin; Roman Petrov |
| Individual foil | Heo Jun; South Korea | Chen Haiwei; China | Li Chen; China |
| Individual foil | Heo Jun; South Korea | Chen Haiwei; China | Kenta Chida; Japan |
| Team foil | China; Chen Haiwei; Lei Sheng; Li Chen; Ma Jianfei | South Korea; Heo Jun; Kim Hyo-gon; Kim Min-kyu; Son Young-ki | Japan; Suguru Awaji; Kenta Chida; Ryo Miyake; Yuki Ota |
| Team foil | China; Chen Haiwei; Lei Sheng; Li Chen; Ma Jianfei | South Korea; Heo Jun; Kim Hyo-gon; Kim Min-kyu; Son Young-ki | Hong Kong; Cheung Ka Long; Cheung Siu Lun; Nicholas Choi; Yeung Chi Ka |
| Individual sabre | Gu Bon-gil; South Korea | Mojtaba Abedini; Iran | Lam Hin Chung; Hong Kong |
| Individual sabre | Gu Bon-gil; South Korea | Mojtaba Abedini; Iran | Ali Pakdaman; Iran |
| Team sabre | South Korea; Gu Bon-gil; Kim Jung-hwan; Oh Eun-seok; Won Woo-young | Japan; Ryo Miyayama; Tomohiro Shimamura; Shun Tanaka; Kenta Tokunan | China; Fang Xin; Sun Wei; Xu Yingming; Zhang Xiaotian |
| Team sabre | South Korea; Gu Bon-gil; Kim Jung-hwan; Oh Eun-seok; Won Woo-young | Japan; Ryo Miyayama; Tomohiro Shimamura; Shun Tanaka; Kenta Tokunan | Iran; Mojtaba Abedini; Farzad Baher; Ali Pakdaman; Mohammad Rahbari |

=== Women ===
| Event | Gold | Silver | Bronze |
|---|---|---|---|
| Individual épée | Choi In-jeong; South Korea | Shin A-lam; South Korea | Ayaka Shimookawa; Japan |
| Individual épée | Choi In-jeong; South Korea | Shin A-lam; South Korea | Qin Xue; China |
| Team épée | China; Qin Xue; Lin Sheng; Sun Yiwen; Sun Yujie | South Korea; Choi Eun-sook; Choi In-jeong; Kim Myoung-sun; Shin A-lam | Hong Kong; Chu Ka Mong; Vivian Kong; Coco Lin; Yeung Chui Ling |
| Team épée | China; Qin Xue; Lin Sheng; Sun Yiwen; Sun Yujie | South Korea; Choi Eun-sook; Choi In-jeong; Kim Myoung-sun; Shin A-lam | Japan; Shiori Komata; Miho Morioka; Rie Ohashi; Ayaka Shimookawa |
| Individual foil | Nam Hyun-hee; South Korea | Jeon Hee-sook; South Korea | Chen Bingbing; China |
| Individual foil | Nam Hyun-hee; South Korea | Jeon Hee-sook; South Korea | Le Huilin; China |
| Team foil | South Korea; Jeon Hee-sook; Kim Mi-na; Nam Hyun-hee; Oh Ha-na | China; Chen Bingbing; Le Huilin; Liu Yongshi; Wang Chen | Japan; Hiromi Kusano; Karin Miyawaki; Shiho Nishioka; Haruka Yanaoka |
| Team foil | South Korea; Jeon Hee-sook; Kim Mi-na; Nam Hyun-hee; Oh Ha-na | China; Chen Bingbing; Le Huilin; Liu Yongshi; Wang Chen | Hong Kong; Cheng Hiu Lam; Kimberley Cheung; Lin Po Heung; Liu Yan Wai |
| Individual sabre | Kim Ji-yeon; South Korea | Misaki Emura; Japan | Lee Ra-jin; South Korea |
| Individual sabre | Kim Ji-yeon; South Korea | Misaki Emura; Japan | Shen Chen; China |
| Team sabre | China; Li Fei; Shen Chen; Yu Xinting; Zhang Xueqian | South Korea; Hwang Seon-a; Kim Ji-yeon; Lee Ra-jin; Yoon Ji-su | Kazakhstan; Aibike Khabibullina; Diana Pamansha; Tamara Pochekutova; Yuliya Zhivitsa |
| Team sabre | China; Li Fei; Shen Chen; Yu Xinting; Zhang Xueqian | South Korea; Hwang Seon-a; Kim Ji-yeon; Lee Ra-jin; Yoon Ji-su | Hong Kong; Au Sin Ying; Karen Chang; Jenny Ho; Lam Hin Wai |

== Medal table ==
| Rank | Nation | Gold | Silver | Bronze | Total |
|---|---|---|---|---|---|
| 1 | South Korea | 9 | 5 | 2 | 16 |
| 2 | China | 3 | 3 | 6 | 12 |
| 3 | Japan | 0 | 3 | 6 | 9 |
| 4 | Iran | 0 | 1 | 2 | 3 |
| 5 | Hong Kong | 0 | 0 | 5 | 5 |
| 6 | Kazakhstan | 0 | 0 | 1 | 1 |
| 6 | Kyrgyzstan | 0 | 0 | 1 | 1 |
| 6 | Uzbekistan | 0 | 0 | 1 | 1 |
| Totals (8 entries) | | 12 | 12 | 24 | 48 |
