= Fencing at the 2014 Asian Games – Men's team sabre =

Men's team sabre at the 2014 Asian Games
- Venue: Goyang Gymnasium
- Date: 24 September 2014
- Competitors: 37 from 10 nations

Medalists
gold medal	South Korea; Gu Bon-gil, Kim Jung-hwan, Oh Eun-seok, Won Woo-young
silver medal	Iran; Mojtaba Abedini, Farzad Baher, Ali Pakdaman, Mohammad Rahbari
bronze medal	Hong Kong; Cyrus Chang, Lam Hin Chung, Low Ho Tin, Yan Hon Pan
bronze medal	China; Fang Xin, Sun Wei, Tan Sheng, Xu Yingming

The men's team sabre competition at the 2014 Asian Games in Goyang was held on 24 September at the Goyang Gymnasium.

== Schedule ==
All times are Korea Standard Time (UTC+09:00)

Date	Time	Event
Wednesday, 24 September 2014	12:20	Round of 16
Wednesday, 24 September 2014	13:40	Quarterfinals
Wednesday, 24 September 2014	15:00	Semifinals
Wednesday, 24 September 2014	19:10	Gold medal match

== Seeding ==
The teams were seeded taking into account the results achieved by competitors representing each team in the individual event.

Rank	Team	Fencer		Total
Rank	Team	1	2	Total
1	South Korea (KOR)	1	2	3
2	China (CHN)	3	7	10
3	Iran (IRI)	5	6	11
4	Hong Kong (HKG)	3	12	15
5	Kazakhstan (KAZ)	8	9	17
6	Japan (JPN)	10	15	25
6	Vietnam (VIE)	11	14	25
8	Qatar (QAT)	16	20	36
9	Kuwait (KUW)	13	—	37
10	Saudi Arabia (KSA)	18	21	39

== Results ==
Round of 16
9	Kuwait	45
8	Qatar	31
7	Japan	45
10	Saudi Arabia	14

Quarterfinals
1	South Korea	45
9	Kuwait	25
5	Kazakhstan	44
4	Hong Kong	45
3	Iran	45
6	Vietnam	19
7	Japan	41
2	China	45

Semifinals
1	South Korea	45
4	Hong Kong	23
3	Iran	45
2	China	44

Gold medal match
1	South Korea	45
3	Iran	26

== Final standing ==
Rank	Team
1st place, gold medalist(s)	South Korea (KOR); Gu Bon-gil; Kim Jung-hwan; Oh Eun-seok; Won Woo-young
2nd place, silver medalist(s)	Iran (IRI); Mojtaba Abedini; Farzad Baher; Ali Pakdaman; Mohammad Rahbari
3rd place, bronze medalist(s)	Hong Kong (HKG); Cyrus Chang; Lam Hin Chung; Low Ho Tin; Yan Hon Pan
3rd place, bronze medalist(s)	China (CHN); Fang Xin; Sun Wei; Tan Sheng; Xu Yingming
5	Kazakhstan (KAZ); Yevgeniy Frolov; Yerali Tilenshiyev; Zhanserik Turlybekov
6	Vietnam (VIE); Nguyễn Văn Tiến; Nguyễn Xuân Lợi; Tô Đức Anh; Vũ Thành An
7	Japan (JPN); Ryo Miyayama; Tomohiro Shimamura; Kenta Tokunan
8	Kuwait (KUW); Abdullah Al-Shamali; Khaled Al-Shamlan; Yousef Al-Shamlan
9	Qatar (QAT); Nasr Al-Saadi; Ahmed Al-Siddiq; Abdullah Barzegar; Ahmad Salmanpour
10	Saudi Arabia (KSA); Meshari Al-Bashir; Adel Al-Mutairi; Aqeel Al-Neamah; Ahmed Al-Qudihi
