= Fencing at the 2014 Asian Games – Men's individual sabre =

Men's individual sabre at the 2014 Asian Games
- Venue: Goyang Gymnasium
- Date: 21 September 2014
- Competitors: 23 from 13 nations

Medalists
gold medal	Gu Bon-gil	South Korea
silver medal	Kim Jung-hwan	South Korea
bronze medal	Lam Hin Chung	Hong Kong
bronze medal	Sun Wei	China

The men's individual sabre competition at the 2014 Asian Games in Goyang was held on 21 September at the Goyang Gymnasium.

== Schedule ==
All times are Korea Standard Time (UTC+09:00)

Date	Time	Event
Sunday, 21 September 2014	13:30	Preliminaries
Sunday, 21 September 2014	15:00	Round of 32
Sunday, 21 September 2014	15:40	Round of 16
Sunday, 21 September 2014	16:40	Quarterfinals
Sunday, 21 September 2014	19:10	Semifinals
Sunday, 21 September 2014	20:20	Gold medal match

== Results ==
=== Preliminaries ===
==== Pool A ====
Athlete	KOR	JPN	KAZ	KUW	KSA
Gu Bon-gil (KOR)	—	5–1	3–5	5–4	5–0
Tomohiro Shimamura (JPN)	1–5	—	3–5	4–5	5–1
Yevgeniy Frolov (KAZ)	5–3	5–3	—	2–5	5–2
Khaled Al-Shamlan (KUW)	4–5	5–4	5–2	—	1–5
Meshari Al-Bashir (KSA)	0–5	1–5	2–5	5–1	—

==== Pool B ====
Athlete	KOR	VIE	CHN	UZB	KAZ	BRU
Kim Jung-hwan (KOR)	—	5–1	5–3	5–1	5–3	5–1
Vũ Thành An (VIE)	1–5	—	4–5	5–2	5–4	5–2
Xu Yingming (CHN)	3–5	5–4	—	5–0	4–5	5–0
Evgeniy Konovalov (UZB)	1–5	2–5	0–5	—	2–5	5–2
Yerali Tilenshiyev (KAZ)	3–5	4–5	5–4	5–2	—	5–0
Mohd Yunos Hj Hamid (BRU)	1–5	2–5	0–5	2–5	0–5	—

==== Pool C ====
Athlete	IRI	HKG	JPN	THA	KUW	QAT
Mojtaba Abedini (IRI)	—	5–2	5–4	5–2	5–4	5–2
Lam Hin Chung (HKG)	2–5	—	5–1	5–0	5–1	5–4
Kenta Tokunan (JPN)	4–5	1–5	—	5–0	5–0	5–1
Ruangrit Haekerd (THA)	2–5	0–5	0–5	—	5–4	5–4
Abdullah Al-Khaiyat (KUW)	4–5	1–5	0–5	4–5	—	3–5
Ahmed Al-Siddiq (QAT)	2–5	4–5	1–5	4–5	5–3	—

==== Pool D ====
Athlete	CHN	IRI	HKG	VIE	KSA	QAT
Sun Wei (CHN)	—	5–3	5–0	5–4	5–3	5–1
Ali Pakdaman (IRI)	3–5	—	5–1	5–1	5–2	5–0
Low Ho Tin (HKG)	0–5	1–5	—	5–3	5–4	5–1
Nguyễn Xuân Lợi (VIE)	4–5	1–5	3–5	—	5–2	5–0
Aqeel Al-Neamah (KSA)	3–5	2–5	4–5	2–5	—	4–5
Abdullah Barzegar (QAT)	1–5	0–5	1–5	0–5	5–4	—

==== Summary ====
Rank	Pool	Athlete	W	L	W/M	TD	TF
1	B	Kim Jung-hwan (KOR)	5	0	1.000	+16	25
2	D	Sun Wei (CHN)	5	0	1.000	+14	25
3	C	Mojtaba Abedini (IRI)	5	0	1.000	+11	25
4	D	Ali Pakdaman (IRI)	4	1	0.800	+14	23
5	C	Lam Hin Chung (HKG)	4	1	0.800	+11	22
6	A	Gu Bon-gil (KOR)	3	1	0.750	+8	18
7	A	Yevgeniy Frolov (KAZ)	3	1	0.750	+4	17
8	C	Kenta Tokunan (JPN)	3	2	0.600	+9	20
9	B	Xu Yingming (CHN)	3	2	0.600	+8	22
10	B	Yerali Tilenshiyev (KAZ)	3	2	0.600	+6	22
11	B	Vũ Thành An (VIE)	3	2	0.600	+2	20
12	D	Low Ho Tin (HKG)	3	2	0.600	−2	16
13	A	Khaled Al-Shamlan (KUW)	2	2	0.500	−1	15
14	D	Nguyễn Xuân Lợi (VIE)	2	3	0.400	+1	18
15	C	Ruangrit Haekerd (THA)	2	3	0.400	−11	12
16	A	Tomohiro Shimamura (JPN)	1	3	0.250	−3	13
17	A	Meshari Al-Bashir (KSA)	1	3	0.250	−8	8
18	C	Ahmed Al-Siddiq (QAT)	1	4	0.200	−7	16
19	B	Evgeniy Konovalov (UZB)	1	4	0.200	−12	10
20	D	Abdullah Barzegar (QAT)	1	4	0.200	−17	7
21	D	Aqeel Al-Neamah (KSA)	0	5	0.000	−10	15
22	C	Abdullah Al-Khaiyat (KUW)	0	5	0.000	−13	12
23	B	Mohd Yunos Hj Hamid (BRU)	0	5	0.000	−20	5

=== Knockout round ===
==== Final ====
Gold medal match
1	Kim Jung-hwan (KOR)	13
6	Gu Bon-gil (KOR)	15

==== Top half ====
Round of 32
17	Meshari Al-Bashir (KSA)	10
16	Tomohiro Shimamura (JPN)	15

Round of 16
1	Kim Jung-hwan (KOR)	15
16	Tomohiro Shimamura (JPN)	9
9	Xu Yingming (CHN)	15
8	Kenta Tokunan (JPN)	7
5	Lam Hin Chung (HKG)	15
12	Low Ho Tin (HKG)	7
13	Khaled Al-Shamlan (KUW)	10
4	Ali Pakdaman (IRI)	15

Quarterfinals
1	Kim Jung-hwan (KOR)	15
9	Xu Yingming (CHN)	6
5	Lam Hin Chung (HKG)	15
4	Ali Pakdaman (IRI)	13

Semifinals
1	Kim Jung-hwan (KOR)	15
5	Lam Hin Chung (HKG)	9

==== Bottom half ====
Round of 32
15	Ruangrit Haekerd (THA)	14
18	Ahmed Al-Siddiq (QAT)	15

Round of 16
3	Mojtaba Abedini (IRI)	15
14	Nguyễn Xuân Lợi (VIE)	11
11	Vũ Thành An (VIE)	10
6	Gu Bon-gil (KOR)	15
7	Yevgeniy Frolov (KAZ)	7
10	Yerali Tilenshiyev (KAZ)	15
18	Ahmed Al-Siddiq (QAT)	4
2	Sun Wei (CHN)	15

Quarterfinals
3	Mojtaba Abedini (IRI)	10
6	Gu Bon-gil (KOR)	15
10	Yerali Tilenshiyev (KAZ)	9
2	Sun Wei (CHN)	15

Semifinals
6	Gu Bon-gil (KOR)	15
2	Sun Wei (CHN)	10

== Final standing ==
Rank	Athlete
1st place, gold medalist(s)	Gu Bon-gil (KOR)
2nd place, silver medalist(s)	Kim Jung-hwan (KOR)
3rd place, bronze medalist(s)	Lam Hin Chung (HKG)
3rd place, bronze medalist(s)	Sun Wei (CHN)
5	Mojtaba Abedini (IRI)
6	Ali Pakdaman (IRI)
7	Xu Yingming (CHN)
8	Yerali Tilenshiyev (KAZ)
9	Yevgeniy Frolov (KAZ)
10	Kenta Tokunan (JPN)
11	Vũ Thành An (VIE)
12	Low Ho Tin (HKG)
13	Khaled Al-Shamlan (KUW)
14	Nguyễn Xuân Lợi (VIE)
15	Tomohiro Shimamura (JPN)
16	Ahmed Al-Siddiq (QAT)
17	Ruangrit Haekerd (THA)
18	Meshari Al-Bashir (KSA)
19	Evgeniy Konovalov (UZB)
20	Abdullah Barzegar (QAT)
21	Aqeel Al-Neamah (KSA)
22	Abdullah Al-Khaiyat (KUW)
23	Mohd Yunos Hj Hamid (BRU)
