= 2015 Asian Fencing Championships =

Fencing tournament in Singapore

- Host city: Singapore
- Dates: 25–30 July 2015
- Main venue: Singapore Sports Hub

The 2015 Asian Fencing Championships were held in Singapore from 25 to 30 July 2015 at the Singapore Sports Hub in Kallang.

== Medal summary ==
=== Men ===
Event	Gold	Silver	Bronze
Individual épée	Jiao Yunlong; China	Park Kyoung-doo; South Korea	Elmir Alimzhanov; Kazakhstan
Individual épée	Jiao Yunlong; China	Park Kyoung-doo; South Korea	Kazuyasu Minobe; Japan
Team épée	Kazakhstan; Dmitriy Alexanin; Elmir Alimzhanov; Ivan Deryabin; Ruslan Kurbanov	China; Dong Chao; Jiao Yunlong; Li Guojie; Li Zhen	Japan; Kazuyasu Minobe; Keisuke Sakamoto; Satoru Uyama; Masaru Yamada
Team épée	Kazakhstan; Dmitriy Alexanin; Elmir Alimzhanov; Ivan Deryabin; Ruslan Kurbanov	China; Dong Chao; Jiao Yunlong; Li Guojie; Li Zhen	South Korea; Jung Seung-hwa; Kweon Young-jun; Na Jong-kwan; Park Kyoung-doo
Individual foil	Yuki Ota; Japan	Son Young-ki; South Korea	Kwon Young-ho; South Korea
Individual foil	Yuki Ota; Japan	Son Young-ki; South Korea	Cheung Ka Long; Hong Kong
Team foil	China; Chen Haiwei; Lei Sheng; Ma Jianfei; Shi Jialuo	South Korea; Ha Tae-gyu; Heo Jun; Kwon Young-ho; Son Young-ki	Japan; Suguru Awaji; Kenta Chida; Ryo Miyake; Yuki Ota
Team foil	China; Chen Haiwei; Lei Sheng; Ma Jianfei; Shi Jialuo	South Korea; Ha Tae-gyu; Heo Jun; Kwon Young-ho; Son Young-ki	Hong Kong; Cheung Ka Long; Cheung Siu Lun; Nicholas Choi; Yeung Chi Ka
Individual sabre	Kim Jung-hwan; South Korea	Gu Bon-gil; South Korea	Won Woo-young; South Korea
Individual sabre	Kim Jung-hwan; South Korea	Gu Bon-gil; South Korea	Mojtaba Abedini; Iran
Team sabre	South Korea; Gu Bon-gil; Kim Jung-hwan; Oh Eun-seok; Won Woo-young	Iran; Mojtaba Abedini; Farzad Baher; Ali Pakdaman; Mohammad Rahbari	China; Fang Xin; Sun Wei; Xu Yingming; Zhang Xiaotian
Team sabre	South Korea; Gu Bon-gil; Kim Jung-hwan; Oh Eun-seok; Won Woo-young	Iran; Mojtaba Abedini; Farzad Baher; Ali Pakdaman; Mohammad Rahbari	Kazakhstan; Sergey Aniskov; Yevgeniy Frolov; Ilya Mokretsov; Yerali Tilenshiyev

=== Women ===
Event	Gold	Silver	Bronze
Individual épée	Xu Anqi; China	Choi In-jeong; South Korea	Ayaka Shimookawa; Japan
Individual épée	Xu Anqi; China	Choi In-jeong; South Korea	Nozomi Sato; Japan
Team épée	South Korea; Choi Eun-sook; Choi In-jeong; Kang Young-mi; Shin A-lam	China; Hao Jialu; Sun Yiwen; Sun Yujie; Xu Anqi	Japan; Rie Ohashi; Nozomi Sato; Ayaka Shimookawa; Ayumi Yamada
Team épée	South Korea; Choi Eun-sook; Choi In-jeong; Kang Young-mi; Shin A-lam	China; Hao Jialu; Sun Yiwen; Sun Yujie; Xu Anqi	Hong Kong; Chu Ka Mong; Circle Ho; Vivian Kong; Coco Lin
Individual foil	Jeon Hee-sook; South Korea	Nam Hyun-hee; South Korea	Le Huilin; China
Individual foil	Jeon Hee-sook; South Korea	Nam Hyun-hee; South Korea	Kim Mi-na; South Korea
Team foil	South Korea; Jeon Hee-sook; Kim Mi-na; Lim Seung-min; Nam Hyun-hee	China; Chen Qinghui; Gong Yu; Le Huilin; Liu Yongshi	Hong Kong; Valerie Cheng; Kimberley Cheung; Lin Po Heung; Liu Yan Wai
Team foil	South Korea; Jeon Hee-sook; Kim Mi-na; Lim Seung-min; Nam Hyun-hee	China; Chen Qinghui; Gong Yu; Le Huilin; Liu Yongshi	Japan; Minami Kano; Karin Miyawaki; Shiho Nishioka; Haruka Yanaoka
Individual sabre	Shen Chen; China	Chika Aoki; Japan	Kim Ji-yeon; South Korea
Individual sabre	Shen Chen; China	Chika Aoki; Japan	Misaki Emura; Japan
Team sabre	South Korea; Hwang Seon-a; Kim Ji-yeon; Lee Ra-jin; Yoon Ji-su	China; Qian Jiarui; Shen Chen; Yin Haiyun; Yu Xinting	Japan; Chika Aoki; Misaki Emura; Norika Tamura; Seira Yamamoto
Team sabre	South Korea; Hwang Seon-a; Kim Ji-yeon; Lee Ra-jin; Yoon Ji-su	China; Qian Jiarui; Shen Chen; Yin Haiyun; Yu Xinting	Hong Kong; Au Sin Ying; Karen Chang; Jenny Ho; Lam Hin Wai

== Medal table ==
Rank	Nation	Gold	Silver	Bronze	Total
1	South Korea	6	6	5	17
2	China	4	4	2	10
3	Japan	1	1	9	11
4	Kazakhstan	1	0	2	3
5	Iran	0	1	1	2
6	Hong Kong	0	0	5	5
Totals (6 entries)		12	12	24	48

== Results ==
=== Men ===
==== Individual épée ====
Quarterfinals		Semifinals		Final
Park Kyoung-doo (KOR)	15
Li Zhen (CHN)	7	Park Kyoung-doo (KOR)	15
Elmir Alimzhanov (KAZ)	15	Elmir Alimzhanov (KAZ)	11
Jung Seung-hwa (KOR)	14			Park Kyoung-doo (KOR)	10
Li Guojie (CHN)	2			Jiao Yunlong (CHN)	11
Jiao Yunlong (CHN)	4	Jiao Yunlong (CHN)	15
Aleksandr Chernykh (KGZ)	13	Kazuyasu Minobe (JPN)	11
Kazuyasu Minobe (JPN)	15

==== Team épée ====
Quarterfinals
South Korea	45
Uzbekistan	32
Kyrgyzstan	44
Kazakhstan	45
China	45
Chinese Taipei	24
Australia	20
Japan	45

Semifinals
South Korea	37
Kazakhstan	45
China	21
Japan	15

Final
Kazakhstan	45
China	43
3rd place
South Korea	43
Japan	45

==== Individual foil ====
Quarterfinals		Semifinals		Final
Son Young-ki (KOR)	15
Heo Jun (KOR)	11	Son Young-ki (KOR)	15
Lei Sheng (CHN)	10	Kwon Young-ho (KOR)	7
Kwon Young-ho (KOR)	15			Son Young-ki (KOR)	12
Sholto Douglas (AUS)	10			Yuki Ota (JPN)	15
Yuki Ota (JPN)	15	Yuki Ota (JPN)	15
Kenta Chida (JPN)	7	Cheung Ka Long (HKG)	6
Cheung Ka Long (HKG)	15

==== Team foil ====
Quarterfinals
China	45
Singapore	20
Kazakhstan	19
Hong Kong	45
Japan	45
Australia	18
Thailand	18
South Korea	45

Semifinals
China	45
Hong Kong	30
Japan	35
South Korea	45

Final
China	45
South Korea	31
3rd place
Hong Kong	42
Japan	45

==== Individual sabre ====
Quarterfinals		Semifinals		Final
Won Woo-young (KOR)	15
Mohammad Rahbari (IRI)	14	Won Woo-young (KOR)	9
Gu Bon-gil (KOR)	15	Gu Bon-gil (KOR)	15
Sun Wei (CHN)	9			Gu Bon-gil (KOR)	14
Mojtaba Abedini (IRI)	15			Kim Jung-hwan (KOR)	15
Ali Pakdaman (IRI)	7	Mojtaba Abedini (IRI)	9
Vũ Thành An (VIE)	10	Kim Jung-hwan (KOR)	15
Kim Jung-hwan (KOR)	15

==== Team sabre ====
Quarterfinals
South Korea	45
Chinese Taipei	22
Kazakhstan	45
Japan	42
Iran	45
Hong Kong	37
Vietnam	34
China	45

Semifinals
South Korea	45
Kazakhstan	26
Iran	45
China	31

Final
South Korea	45
Iran	37
3rd place
Kazakhstan	30
China	45

=== Women ===
==== Individual épée ====
Quarterfinals		Semifinals		Final
Sun Yujie (CHN)	14
Ayaka Shimookawa (JPN)	15	Ayaka Shimookawa (JPN)	7
Assel Alibekova (KAZ)	8	Xu Anqi (CHN)	15
Xu Anqi (CHN)	15			Xu Anqi (CHN)	15
Kang Young-mi (KOR)	12			Choi In-jeong (KOR)	13
Nozomi Sato (JPN)	13	Nozomi Sato (JPN)	11
Choi Eun-sook (KOR)	14	Choi In-jeong (KOR)	15
Choi In-jeong (KOR)	15

==== Team épée ====
Quarterfinals
China	45
Kazakhstan	22
Chinese Taipei	29
Japan	45
Hong Kong	44
Australia	43
Singapore	26
South Korea	43

Semifinals
China	45
Japan	30
Hong Kong	39
South Korea	45

Final
China	40
South Korea	45
3rd place
Japan	45
Hong Kong	31

==== Individual foil ====
Quarterfinals		Semifinals		Final
Jeon Hee-sook (KOR)	15
Mona Shaito (LBN)	9	Jeon Hee-sook (KOR)	15
Lim Seung-min (KOR)	13	Le Huilin (CHN)	9
Le Huilin (CHN)	15			Jeon Hee-sook (KOR)	12
Liu Yongshi (CHN)	7			Nam Hyun-hee (KOR)	11
Kim Mi-na (KOR)	15	Kim Mi-na (KOR)	9
Lin Po Heung (HKG)	5	Nam Hyun-hee (KOR)	10
Nam Hyun-hee (KOR)	15

==== Team foil ====
Quarterfinals
South Korea	45
Kazakhstan	12
Australia	27
Hong Kong	45
Japan	45
Singapore	31
Macau	14
China	45

Semifinals
South Korea	44
Hong Kong	26
Japan	25
China	37

Final
South Korea	35
China	32
3rd place
Hong Kong	45
Japan	32

==== Individual sabre ====
Quarterfinals		Semifinals		Final
Kim Ji-yeon (KOR)	15
Hwang Seon-a (KOR)	12	Kim Ji-yeon (KOR)	14
Qian Jiarui (CHN)	11	Shen Chen (CHN)	15
Shen Chen (CHN)	15			Shen Chen (CHN)	15
Misaki Emura (JPN)	15			Chika Aoki (JPN)	7
Yoon Ji-su (KOR)	6	Misaki Emura (JPN)	10
Chika Aoki (JPN)	15	Chika Aoki (JPN)	15
Mika Kikuchi (JPN)	6

==== Team sabre ====
Quarterfinals
South Korea	45
Singapore	21
Kazakhstan	29
Hong Kong	45
Japan	45
Thailand	26
Vietnam	32
China	45

Semifinals
South Korea	45
Hong Kong	26
Japan	39
China	45

Final
South Korea	45
China	34
3rd place
Hong Kong	42
Japan	45
