= Fencing at the 2018 Asian Games – Men's team sabre =

Men's team sabre at the 2018 Asian Games
- Venue: Jakarta Convention Center
- Date: 23 August 2018
- Competitors: 39 from 10 nations

Medalists
gold medal	South Korea; Gu Bon-gil, Kim Jun-ho, Kim Jung-hwan, Oh Sang-uk
silver medal	Iran; Mojtaba Abedini, Farzad Baher, Ali Pakdaman, Mohammad Rahbari
bronze medal	Hong Kong; Cyrus Chang, Lam Hin Chung, Terence Lee, Low Ho Tin
bronze medal	China; Lu Yang, Wang Shi, Xu Yingming, Yan Yinghui

The men's team sabre competition at the 2018 Asian Games in Jakarta was held on 23 August at the Jakarta Convention Center. South Korea team defend the men's team sabre title and captured the gold medal after beat Iranian team 45–32 in the final. The Iranian team is entitled to a silver medal, while the bronze medal won by Chinese and Hong Kong team.

== Schedule ==
All times are Western Indonesia Time (UTC+07:00)

Date	Time	Event
Thursday, 23 August 2018	10:00	Round of 16
Thursday, 23 August 2018	11:30	Quarterfinals
Thursday, 23 August 2018	13:00	Semifinals
Thursday, 23 August 2018	19:00	Gold medal match

== Seeding ==
The teams were seeded taking into account the results achieved by competitors representing each team in the individual event.

Rank	Team	Fencer		Total
Rank	Team	1	2	Total
1	South Korea (KOR)	1	2	3
2	Iran (IRI)	3	8	11
3	China (CHN)	5	9	14
4	Hong Kong (HKG)	3	15	18
5	Vietnam (VIE)	7	11	18
6	Japan (JPN)	6	14	20
7	Indonesia (INA)	10	19	29
8	Thailand (THA)	12	17	29
9	Kazakhstan (KAZ)	13	16	29
10	Qatar (QAT)	18	21	31

== Results ==
Round of 16
9	Kazakhstan	45
8	Thailand	38
7	Indonesia	45
10	Qatar	27

Quarterfinals
1	South Korea	45
9	Kazakhstan	17
5	Vietnam	36
4	Hong Kong	45
3	China	45
6	Japan	24
7	Indonesia	21
2	Iran	45

Semifinals
1	South Korea	45
4	Hong Kong	20
3	China	43
2	Iran	45

Gold medal match
1	South Korea	45
2	Iran	32

== Final standing ==
Rank	Team
1st place, gold medalist(s)	South Korea (KOR); Gu Bon-gil; Kim Jun-ho; Kim Jung-hwan; Oh Sang-uk
2nd place, silver medalist(s)	Iran (IRI); Mojtaba Abedini; Farzad Baher; Ali Pakdaman; Mohammad Rahbari
3rd place, bronze medalist(s)	Hong Kong (HKG); Cyrus Chang; Lam Hin Chung; Terence Lee; Low Ho Tin
3rd place, bronze medalist(s)	China (CHN); Lu Yang; Wang Shi; Xu Yingming; Yan Yinghui
5	Vietnam (VIE); Nguyễn Xuân Lợi; Tô Đức Anh; Vũ Thành An; Vũ Văn Hùng
6	Japan (JPN); Tomohiro Shimamura; Kaito Streets; Kenta Tokunan; Kento Yoshida
7	Indonesia (INA); Hendri Eko Budianto; Mochammad Nizar Fardhani; Indra Agus Setiawan; Muhammad Zuhdi
8	Kazakhstan (KAZ); Sergey Aniskov; Damir Ibragimov; Nurzhan Karim; Ilya Mokretsov
9	Thailand (THA); Ruangrit Haekerd; Soravit Kitsiriboon; Kanisorn Pangmoon; Voragun Srinualnad
10	Qatar (QAT); Nasr Al-Saadi; Khalifa Al-Yazeedi; Ahmad Salmanpour
