= 2013 Asian Fencing Championships =

- Host city: Shanghai, China
- Dates: 4–9 June 2013
- Main venue: Jing'an Gymnasium

The 2013 Asian Fencing Championships was held in Shanghai, China from 4 June to 9 June 2013.

== Medal summary ==
=== Men ===
Event	Gold	Silver	Bronze
Individual épée	Elmir Alimzhanov; Kazakhstan	Kweon Young-jun; South Korea	Li Guojie; China
Individual épée	Elmir Alimzhanov; Kazakhstan	Kweon Young-jun; South Korea	Kim Sang-min; South Korea
Team épée	Kazakhstan; Dmitriy Alexanin; Elmir Alimzhanov; Dmitriy Gryaznov; Ruslan Kurbanov	China; Jiao Yunlong; Li Guojie; Li Zhen; Ni Jun	South Korea; An Sung-ho; Kim Sang-min; Kweon Young-jun; Song Jae-ho
Team épée	Kazakhstan; Dmitriy Alexanin; Elmir Alimzhanov; Dmitriy Gryaznov; Ruslan Kurbanov	China; Jiao Yunlong; Li Guojie; Li Zhen; Ni Jun	Hong Kong; Fong Kiu; Clarence Lai; Leung Ka Ming; Nicola Lu
Individual foil	Heo Jun; South Korea	Ryo Miyake; Japan	Cheung Siu Lun; Hong Kong
Individual foil	Heo Jun; South Korea	Ryo Miyake; Japan	Kim Min-kyu; South Korea
Team foil	South Korea; Ha Tae-gyu; Heo Jun; Kim Min-kyu; Son Young-ki	Japan; Kenta Chida; Daiki Fujino; Ryunosuke Kitagawa; Ryo Miyake	China; Chen Haiwei; Li Hua; Ma Jianfei; Shi Jialuo
Team foil	South Korea; Ha Tae-gyu; Heo Jun; Kim Min-kyu; Son Young-ki	Japan; Kenta Chida; Daiki Fujino; Ryunosuke Kitagawa; Ryo Miyake	Hong Kong; Cheung Siu Lun; Nicholas Choi; Chu Wing Hong; Yeung Chi Ka
Individual sabre	Gu Bon-gil; South Korea	Kim Jung-hwan; South Korea	Mojtaba Abedini; Iran
Individual sabre	Gu Bon-gil; South Korea	Kim Jung-hwan; South Korea	Oh Eun-seok; South Korea
Team sabre	South Korea; Gu Bon-gil; Kim Jung-hwan; Kim Kye-hwan; Oh Eun-seok	Iran; Mojtaba Abedini; Mohammad Fotouhi; Ali Pakdaman; Mohammad Rahbari	Kazakhstan; Yevgeniy Frolov; Ilya Mokretsov; Yerali Tilenshiyev; Zhanserik Turlybekov
Team sabre	South Korea; Gu Bon-gil; Kim Jung-hwan; Kim Kye-hwan; Oh Eun-seok	Iran; Mojtaba Abedini; Mohammad Fotouhi; Ali Pakdaman; Mohammad Rahbari	Japan; Ryo Miyayama; Tomohiro Shimamura; Shun Tanaka; Kenta Tokunan

=== Women ===
Event	Gold	Silver	Bronze
Individual épée	Xu Anqi; China	Jo Halls; Australia	Sun Yujie; China
Individual épée	Xu Anqi; China	Jo Halls; Australia	Yeung Chui Ling; Hong Kong
Team épée	China; Li Na; Sun Yujie; Xu Anqi; Yin Mingfang	South Korea; Choi Eun-sook; Choi Hyo-joo; Choi In-jeong; Shin A-lam	Hong Kong; Bjork Cheng; Cheung Sik Lui; Chu Ka Mong; Yeung Chui Ling
Team épée	China; Li Na; Sun Yujie; Xu Anqi; Yin Mingfang	South Korea; Choi Eun-sook; Choi Hyo-joo; Choi In-jeong; Shin A-lam	Kazakhstan; Assel Alibekova; Ulyana Balaganskaya; Jamilya Yunusbayeva; Yanina Zakharova
Individual foil	Jeon Hee-sook; South Korea	Liu Yongshi; China	Kim Mi-na; South Korea
Individual foil	Jeon Hee-sook; South Korea	Liu Yongshi; China	Jung Gil-ok; South Korea
Team foil	South Korea; Jeon Hee-sook; Jung Gil-ok; Kim Mi-na; Lim Seung-min	China; Chen Jinyan; Chen Xiaoxia; Le Huilin; Liu Yongshi	Japan; Minami Kano; Karin Miyawaki; Shiho Nishioka; Haruka Yanaoka
Team foil	South Korea; Jeon Hee-sook; Jung Gil-ok; Kim Mi-na; Lim Seung-min	China; Chen Jinyan; Chen Xiaoxia; Le Huilin; Liu Yongshi	Hong Kong; Cheng Hiu Lam; Kimberley Cheung; Lin Po Heung; Liu Yan Wai
Individual sabre	Kim Ji-yeon; South Korea	Lee Ra-jin; South Korea	Shen Chen; China
Individual sabre	Kim Ji-yeon; South Korea	Lee Ra-jin; South Korea	Zhu Min; China
Team sabre	South Korea; Kim A-ra; Kim Ji-yeon; Lee Ra-jin; Yoon Ji-su	China; Liang Huixian; Shen Chen; Xia Min; Zhu Min	Kazakhstan; Aibike Khabibullina; Tamara Pochekutova; Zhansaya Serikbayeva; Yuliya Zhivitsa
Team sabre	South Korea; Kim A-ra; Kim Ji-yeon; Lee Ra-jin; Yoon Ji-su	China; Liang Huixian; Shen Chen; Xia Min; Zhu Min	Hong Kong; Au Sin Ying; Au Yeung Wai Sum; Jenny Ho; Lam Hin Wai

== Medal table ==
Rank	Nation	Gold	Silver	Bronze	Total
1	South Korea	8	4	6	18
2	China	2	4	5	11
3	Kazakhstan	2	0	3	5
4	Japan	0	2	2	4
5	Iran	0	1	1	2
6	Australia	0	1	0	1
7	Hong Kong	0	0	7	7
Totals (7 entries)		12	12	24	48
