= Fencing at the 2010 Asian Games – Men's team sabre =

Men's team sabre at the 2010 Asian Games
- Venue: Guangda Gymnasium
- Date: 22 November 2010
- Competitors: 30 from 8 nations

Medalists
gold medal	China; Jiang Kelü, Liu Xiao, Wang Jingzhi, Zhong Man
silver medal	South Korea; Gu Bon-gil, Kim Jung-hwan, Oh Eun-seok, Won Woo-young
bronze medal	Kazakhstan; Yevgeniy Frolov, Yerali Tilenshiyev, Zhanserik Turlybekov
bronze medal	Japan; Shinya Kudo, Satoshi Ogawa, Koji Yamamoto

The men's team sabre competition at the 2010 Asian Games in Guangzhou was held on 22 November at the Guangda Gymnasium.

== Schedule ==
All times are China Standard Time (UTC+08:00)

Date	Time	Event
Monday, 22 November 2010	09:00	Quarterfinals
Monday, 22 November 2010	10:30	Semifinals
Monday, 22 November 2010	18:00	Gold medal match

== Seeding ==
The teams were seeded taking into account the results achieved by competitors representing each team in the individual event.

Rank	Team	Fencer		Total
Rank	Team	1	2	Total
1	South Korea (KOR)	1	3	4
2	China (CHN)	2	3	5
3	Japan (JPN)	6	9	15
4	Kazakhstan (KAZ)	7	10	17
5	Iran (IRI)	8	14	22
6	Athletes from Kuwait (IOC)	16	18	34
7	India (IND)	19	21	40
8	Saudi Arabia (KSA)	20	23	43

== Results ==
Quarterfinals			Semifinals			Gold medal match
1	South Korea	45
8	Saudi Arabia	18	1	South Korea	45
5	Iran	28	4	Kazakhstan	33
4	Kazakhstan	45				1	South Korea	44
3	Japan	45				2	China	45
6	Athletes from Kuwait	23	3	Japan	19
7	India	21	2	China	45
2	China	45

== Final standing ==
Rank	Team
1st place, gold medalist(s)	China (CHN); Jiang Kelü; Liu Xiao; Wang Jingzhi; Zhong Man
2nd place, silver medalist(s)	South Korea (KOR); Gu Bon-gil; Kim Jung-hwan; Oh Eun-seok; Won Woo-young
3rd place, bronze medalist(s)	Kazakhstan (KAZ); Yevgeniy Frolov; Yerali Tilenshiyev; Zhanserik Turlybekov
3rd place, bronze medalist(s)	Japan (JPN); Shinya Kudo; Satoshi Ogawa; Koji Yamamoto
5	Iran (IRI); Mojtaba Abedini; Parviz Darvishi; Amin Ghorbani; Hamid Reza Taherkhani
6	Athletes from Kuwait (IOC); Ahmad Abdulkhedhr; Abdullah Al-Khaiyat; Khaled Al-Shamlan; Abdulwahab Al-Zair
7	India (IND); Surendro Singh Irengbam; Vikram Singh Jamwal; Padma Kumaresan; Notum Walia
8	Saudi Arabia (KSA); Meshari Al-Bashir; Ghazi Al-Monasef; Ramzi Al-Thobaiti; Mohammed Hazazi
