= Fencing at the 2014 Asian Games – Women's team sabre =

Sport of Sabre taking feet at the 2014 Asian Games in Goyang

Women's team sabre at the 2014 Asian Games
- Venue: Goyang Gymnasium
- Date: 23 September 2014
- Competitors: 26 from 7 nations

Medalists
gold medal	South Korea; Hwang Seon-a, Kim Ji-yeon, Lee Ra-jin, Yoon Ji-su
silver medal	China; Li Fei, Qian Jiarui, Shen Chen, Yu Xinting
bronze medal	Hong Kong; Au Sin Ying, Karen Chang, Jenny Ho, Lam Hin Wai
bronze medal	Kazakhstan; Diana Pamansha, Tamara Pochekutova, Tatyana Prikhodko, Yuliya Zhivitsa

The women's team sabre competition at the 2014 Asian Games in Goyang was held on 23 September at the Goyang Gymnasium.

== Schedule ==
All times are Korea Standard Time (UTC+09:00)

Date	Time	Event
Tuesday, 23 September 2014	09:00	Quarterfinals
Tuesday, 23 September 2014	10:10	Semifinals
Tuesday, 23 September 2014	18:00	Gold medal match

== Seeding ==
The teams were seeded taking into account the results achieved by competitors representing each team in the individual event.

Rank	Team	Fencer		Total
Rank	Team	1	2	Total
1	South Korea (KOR)	1	2	3
2	China (CHN)	3	3	6
3	Kazakhstan (KAZ)	5	7	12
4	Hong Kong (HKG)	6	10	16
5	Vietnam (VIE)	8	13	21
6	Indonesia (INA)	11	14	25
7	Japan (JPN)	9	—	26

== Results ==
Quarterfinals
5	Vietnam	42
4	Hong Kong	45
3	Kazakhstan	45
6	Indonesia	31
7	Japan	35
2	China	45

Semifinals
1	South Korea	45
4	Hong Kong	19
3	Kazakhstan	27
2	China	45

Gold medal match
1	South Korea	45
2	China	41

== Final standing ==
Rank	Team
1st place, gold medalist(s)	South Korea (KOR); Hwang Seon-a; Kim Ji-yeon; Lee Ra-jin; Yoon Ji-su
2nd place, silver medalist(s)	China (CHN); Li Fei; Qian Jiarui; Shen Chen; Yu Xinting
3rd place, bronze medalist(s)	Hong Kong (HKG); Au Sin Ying; Karen Chang; Jenny Ho; Lam Hin Wai
3rd place, bronze medalist(s)	Kazakhstan (KAZ); Diana Pamansha; Tamara Pochekutova; Tatyana Prikhodko; Yuliya Zhivitsa
5	Vietnam (VIE); Bùi Thị Thu Hà; Nguyễn Thị Lệ Dung; Nguyễn Thị Thanh Loan; Nguyễn Thị Thủy Chung
6	Indonesia (INA); Reni Anggraini; Diah Permatasari; Ima Sapitri
7	Japan (JPN); Misaki Emura; Maho Hamada; Ayaka Mukae
