= Chu Ka Mong =

Hong Kong fencer

Personal information
- Nickname: Moonie
- Nationality: Hong Kong
- Born: 14 May 1995 (age 31)
- Height: 1.62 cm (1 in)
- Weight: 60 kg (132 lb)

Fencing career
- Event: Women's épée
- Sport: Fencing
Medal record
Women's Épée
Representing Hong Kong
Asian Games
Silver medal – second place	2022 Hangzhou	Team
Bronze medal – third place	2014 Incheon	Team
Bronze medal – third place	2018 Jakarta	Team
Asian Championships
Silver medal – second place	2018 Bangkok	Team
Bronze medal – third place	2013 Shanghai	Team
Bronze medal – third place	2014 Suwon	Team
Bronze medal – third place	2015 Singapore	Team
Bronze medal – third place	2016 Wuxi	Team
Bronze medal – third place	2017 Hong Kong	Team
Bronze medal – third place	2019 Chiba	Team
East Asian Games
Bronze medal – third place	2013 Tianjin	Team

Chu Ka Mong (朱嘉望, born 14 May 1995), also known as Moonie Chu, is a fencer from Hong Kong. She competed in the 2020 Summer Olympics.
