= Fencing at the 2005 Islamic Solidarity Games =

Fencing at the 2005 Islamic Solidarity Games was held in King Fahad Sports City, Ta'if from April 11 to April 16, 2005.

== Medal summary ==
Event	Gold	Silver	Bronze
Individual épée	Muhannad Saif El-Din; Egypt	Mohammad Hossein Abedi; Iran	Mohammad Rezaei; Iran
Individual épée	Muhannad Saif El-Din; Egypt	Mohammad Hossein Abedi; Iran	Mohammad Al-Ajmi; Kuwait
Team épée	Egypt	Iran	Kuwait
Team épée	Egypt	Iran	Saudi Arabia
Individual foil	Tamer Mohamed Tahoun; Egypt	Tarek Magdy; Egypt	Mostafa Nagaty; Egypt
Individual foil	Tamer Mohamed Tahoun; Egypt	Tarek Magdy; Egypt	Abdulmohsen Shahrayen; Kuwait
Team foil	Egypt	Kuwait	Iran
Team foil	Egypt	Kuwait	Iraq
Individual sabre	Mojtaba Abedini; Iran	Mahmoud Samir; Egypt	Mohammad Malallah; Kuwait
Individual sabre	Mojtaba Abedini; Iran	Mahmoud Samir; Egypt	Majed Al-Muwallad; Saudi Arabia
Team sabre	Egypt	Iran	Azerbaijan
Team sabre	Egypt	Iran	Saudi Arabia

== Medal table ==
Rank	Nation	Gold	Silver	Bronze	Total
1	Egypt	5	2	1	8
2	Iran	1	3	2	6
3	Kuwait	0	1	4	5
4	Saudi Arabia	0	0	3	3
5	Azerbaijan	0	0	1	1
5	Iraq	0	0	1	1
Totals (6 entries)		6	6	12	24
