= Korea Sports Promotion Foundation =

South Korean organization

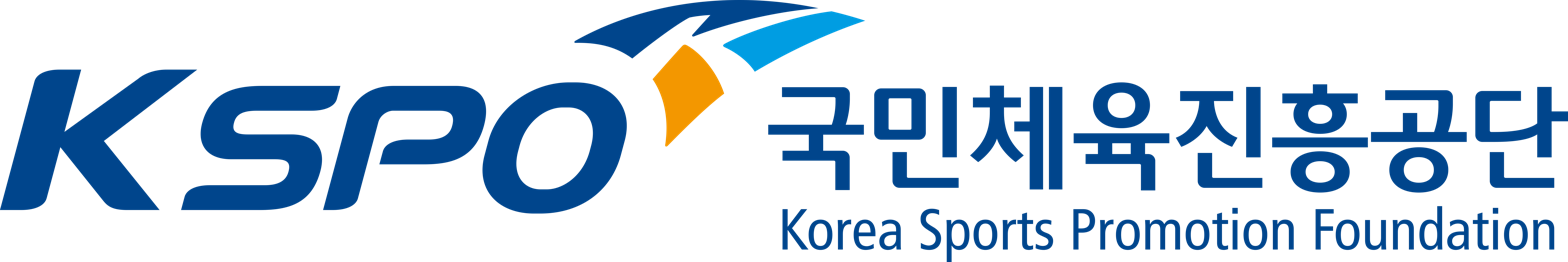
- Native name: 국민체육진흥공단 (國民體育振興公團)
- Predecessor: Seoul Olympic Organizing Committee
- Founded: April 20, 1989; 37 years ago
- Headquarters: Seoul, South Korea
- Key people: Ha Hyung-joo, Chairman
- Owner: Ministry of Culture, Sports and Tourism
- Number of employees: 1,490
- Website: https://www.kspo.or.kr

The Korea Sports Promotion Foundation (KSPO) is a government-funded independently operated company based in Songpa-gu, Seoul, South Korea. Founded in 1989 to continue the legacy of the 1988 Summer Olympics, it is run by the Ministry of Culture, Sports and Tourism.

== History ==
The Korea Sports Promotion Foundation was founded as the Seoul Olympic Sports Promotion Foundation the year after the 1988 Summer Olympics hosted by Seoul. Its original mandate was to manage the sports facilities, which have been opened for public use, specifically built for the Olympics due to concerns raised about Olympic venues being unused and going to waste at the end of the competition. The KSPO was founded to promote the use of those facilities by the public. Since then, it has expanded to include facilitating and supporting community-based sports programs, promoting an active lifestyle to the public and funding research in athlete performance.

When cable TV was launched in 1995, the KSPO started its own channel, Korea Sports TV, but financial difficulties due to the 1997 Asian financial crisis led to it being transferred to SBS in 1999. The channel became the present-day SBS Sports.

The company receives funding from the government and revenue earned from Sports Toto, one of the country's few legal betting services.

== Sports ==
The KSPO sponsors two professional sports team (cycling and women's football) and athletes in the Olympic disciplines of canoeing, diving, fencing and marathon running and Paralympic skiing.

- Canoeing
- Cycling (KSPO Professional)
- Diving
- Fencing
- Football (Hwacheon KSPO WFC)
- Marathon running
- Para-alpine skiing

Notable athletes on its roster include fencers Kim Jung-hwan and Gu Bon-gil and diver Woo Ha-ram.

== Sponsored facilities ==
- Olympic Gymnastics Arena, also known as the KSPO Dome
