= Kim Ji-yeon (fencer) =

South Korean fencer (born 1988)

Kim Ji-yeon 김지연
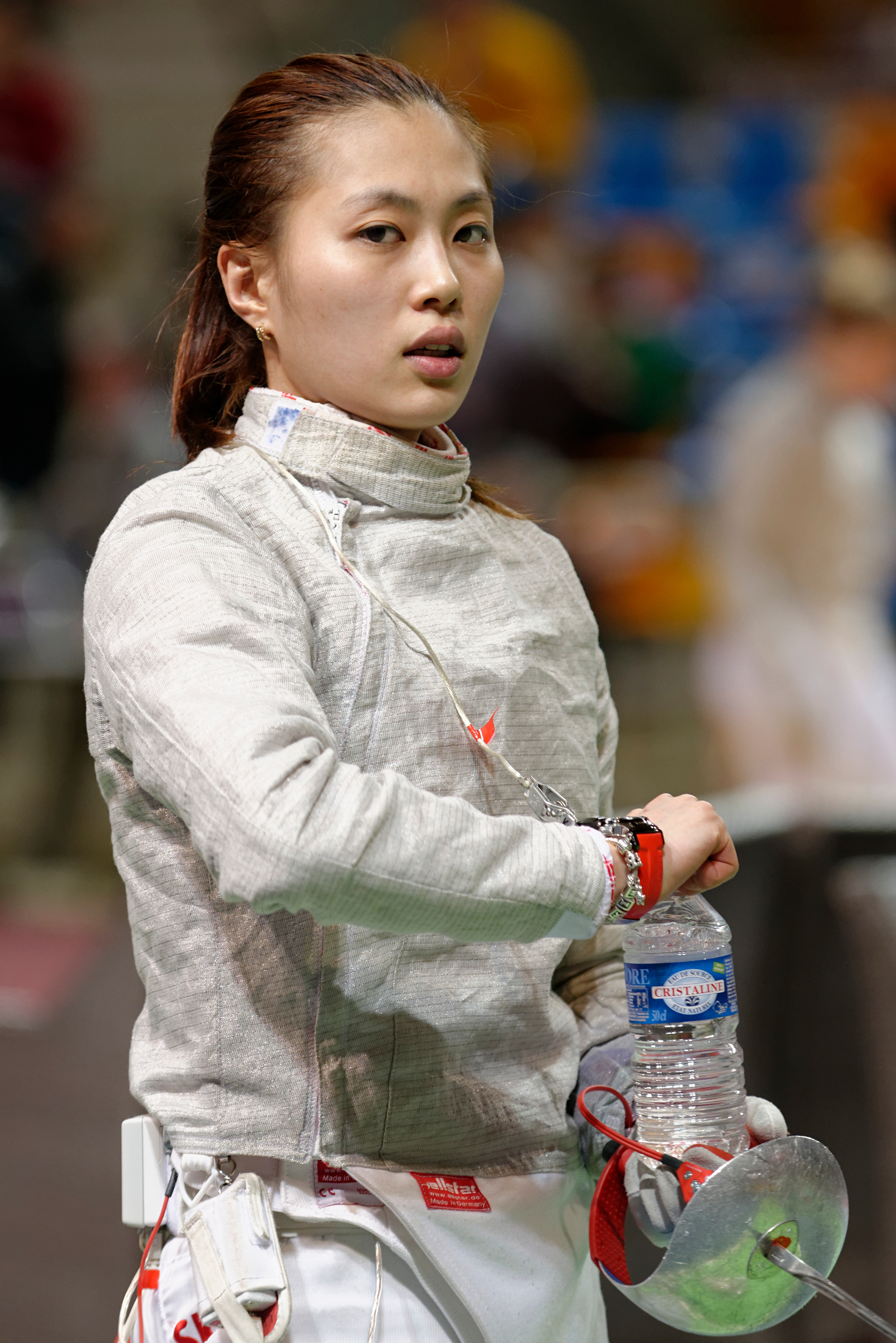
- Kim in 2014

Personal information
- Born: 12 March 1988 (age 38) Busan, South Korea
- Height: 1.65 m (5 ft 5 in)
- Weight: 57 kg (126 lb)

Fencing career
- Sport: Fencing
- Country: South Korea
- Weapon: Sabre
- Hand: left-handed
- Years on national team: 2009–present
- National coach: Han Joo-yeol
- Club: Iksan City Government
- Head coach: Lee Soo-geun
- FIE ranking: current ranking
Medal record
Olympic Games
Gold medal – first place	2012 London	Individual
Bronze medal – third place	2020 Tokyo	Team
World Championships
Silver medal – second place	2017 Leipzig	Team
Bronze medal – third place	2013 Budapest	Individual
Bronze medal – third place	2018 Wuxi	Team
Bronze medal – third place	2019 Budapest	Team
Asian Games
Gold medal – first place	2014 Incheon	Team sabre
Gold medal – first place	2018 Jakarta	Team sabre
Silver medal – second place	2014 Incheon	Individual
Bronze medal – third place	2018 Jakarta	Individual
Asian Championships
Gold medal – first place	2011 Seoul	Team
Gold medal – first place	2012 Wakayama	Team
Gold medal – first place	2013 Shanghai	Individual
Gold medal – first place	2013 Shanghai	Team
Gold medal – first place	2014 Suwon	Individual
Gold medal – first place	2015 Singapore	Team
Gold medal – first place	2017 Hong Kong	Individual
Gold medal – first place	2018 Bangkok	Individual
Silver medal – second place	2014 Suwon	Team
Silver medal – second place	2016 Wuxi	Team
Silver medal – second place	2017 Hong Kong	Team
Silver medal – second place	2018 Bangkok	Team
Bronze medal – third place	2015 Singapore	Individual
Bronze medal – third place	2016 Wuxi	Individual
Universiade
Gold medal – first place	2013 Kazan	Team
Silver medal – second place	2013 Kazan	Individual
Bronze medal – third place	2011 Shenzhen	Individual
Bronze medal – third place	2011 Shenzhen	Team

Kim Ji-yeon (Korean: 김지연; Korean pronunciation: [kim.dʑi.jʌn] or [kim] [tɕi.jʌn]; born 12 March 1988) is a South Korean left-handed sabre fencer.

Kim is a five-time team Asian champion and four-time individual Asian champion.

A three-time Olympian, Kim is a 2021 team Olympic bronze medalist and 2012 individual Olympic champion.

Kim is the first South Korean woman to win an Olympic gold medal in fencing and the second South Korean to win any Olympic medal in fencing after Nam Hyun-hee's silver medal in individual women's foil at the 2008 Beijing Olympic Games. She is also the second South Korean fencer to win an individual gold medal at the Olympic Games, after Kim Young-ho's gold medal in individual men's foil at the 2000 Sydney Olympic Games.

== Biography ==
Kim began fencing at age 13 as a foil fencer, but converted to sabre in high school at age 16 in 2004.

Although she first became a member of the South Korean national fencing team at the age of 18 in 2006, Kim was often overshadowed by fellow sabre fencers Kim Hye-lim, Lee Shin-mi and Kim Keum-hwa, omitted from the final national squad before becoming a fixture in the 2011 season.

Kim began to garner international attention at the 2011 Summer Universiade where she won the bronze medal in the women's individual sabre fencing. In the semifinals, Kim lost to two-time European champion and eventual gold medalist Olha Kharlan of Ukraine 15–10. She accumulated another bronze medal in the women's team sabre as a member of Team South Korea. Kim finished the 2011 season as her first full-time member of the national team, and her FIE ranking rose from 174 to 11.

In February 2012, Kim reached the semifinals at the Orléans Grand Prix, her first international tournament of the 2012 season. Next month, Kim reached her first individual sabre final at the Antalya World Cup in Turkey. In May 2012, Kim became a semi-finalist at the Bologna World Cup in Italy and the Tianjin Grand Prix in China in a row. Her success in these tournaments increased her FIE ranking to 5th before the start of the 2012 Olympics.

=== 2012 Olympics ===
Kim competed at the 2012 Summer Olympics in London capturing the gold medal in the women's individual sabre event. This was South Korea's second Olympic gold medal in fencing, Kim Young-ho having won the men's foil gold medal at the 2000 Summer Olympics.

Kim reached the final when she defeated two-time Olympic individual sabre champion Mariel Zagunis 15–13 in the semifinal match. Largely regarded as the underdog by both competitors and her teammates, she came back from a 12–5 deficit against Zagunis to advance into the finals.

Kim beat Russia's Sofya Velikaya, the reigning world champion, 15–9 in the gold medal match. Kim asserted her dominance early in the contest, with her opponent having little say in the outcome of the first period with an 8–5 triumph for Kim. Velikaya struggled to recover from the setback and the second period followed in much the same way as the first as Kim won 7–4 to win the gold medal.

== Medal record ==
=== Olympic Games ===
Year	Location	Event	Position
2012	London, United Kingdom	Individual Women's Sabre	1st
2021	Tokyo, Japan	Team Women's Sabre	3rd

=== World Championship ===
Year	Location	Event	Position
2013	Budapest, Hungary	Individual Women's Sabre	3rd
2017	Leipzig, Germany	Team Women's Sabre	2nd
2018	Wuxi, China	Team Women's Sabre	3rd
2019	Budapest, Hungary	Team Women's Sabre	3rd

=== Asian Championship ===
Year	Location	Event	Position
2011	Seoul, South Korea	Team Women's Sabre	1st
2012	Wakayama, Japan	Team Women's Sabre	1st
2013	Shanghai, China	Individual Women's Sabre	1st
2013	Shanghai, China	Team Women's Sabre	1st
2014	Suwon, South Korea	Individual Women's Sabre	1st
2014	Suwon, South Korea	Team Women's Sabre	2nd
2015	Singapore	Individual Women's Sabre	3rd
2015	Singapore	Team Women's Sabre	1st
2016	Wuxi, China	Individual Women's Sabre	3rd
2016	Wuxi, China	Team Women's Sabre	2nd
2017	Hong Kong, China	Individual Women's Sabre	1st
2017	Hong Kong, China	Team Women's Sabre	2nd
2018	Bangkok, Thailand	Individual Women's Sabre	1st
2018	Bangkok, Thailand	Team Women's Sabre	2nd
2019	Tokyo, Japan	Individual Women's Sabre	3rd
2019	Tokyo, Japan	Team Women's Sabre	2nd
2022	Seoul, South Korea	Team Women's Sabre	1st

=== Grand Prix ===
Date	Location	Event	Position
2011-03-26	Moscow, Russia	Individual Women's Sabre	3rd
2012-02-10	Orléans, France	Individual Women's Sabre	3rd
2012-05-19	Tianjin, China	Individual Women's Sabre	3rd
2013-05-25	Tianjin, China	Individual Women's Sabre	3rd
2014-01-31	Orléans, France	Individual Women's Sabre	2nd
2014-05-24	Beijing, China	Individual Women's Sabre	3rd
2016-12-16	Cancún, Mexico	Individual Women's Sabre	3rd
2018-05-12	Moscow, Russia	Individual Women's Sabre	3rd
2019-04-26	Seoul, South Korea	Individual Women's Sabre	2nd

=== World Cup ===
Date	Location	Event	Position
2012-03-09	Antalya, Turkey	Individual Women's Sabre	2nd
2012-05-04	Bologna, Italy	Individual Women's Sabre	3rd
2013-03-15	Antalya, Turkey	Individual Women's Sabre	3rd
2013-05-03	(United States) Chicago, Illinois	Individual Women's Sabre	1st
2016-02-19	Sint-Niklaas, Belgium	Individual Women's Sabre	3rd
2016-05-13	Foshan, China	Individual Women's Sabre	2nd
2016-11-18	Orléans, France	Individual Women's Sabre	2nd
2017-01-27	(United States) New York, New York	Individual Women's Sabre	2nd
2017-02-17	Athens, Greece	Individual Women's Sabre	3rd
2019-03-08	Athens, Greece	Individual Women's Sabre	3rd
