= Fencing at the 2014 Asian Games – Women's individual sabre =

Women's individual sabre at the 2014 Asian Games
- Venue: Goyang Gymnasium
- Date: 20 September 2014
- Competitors: 16 from 9 nations

Medalists
gold medal	Lee Ra-jin	South Korea
silver medal	Kim Ji-yeon	South Korea
bronze medal	Li Fei	China
bronze medal	Shen Chen	China

The women's individual sabre competition at the 2014 Asian Games in Goyang was held on 20 September at the Goyang Gymnasium.

== Schedule ==
All times are Korea Standard Time (UTC+09:00)

Date	Time	Event
Saturday, 20 September 2014	09:00	Preliminaries
Saturday, 20 September 2014	10:30	Round of 16
Saturday, 20 September 2014	11:20	Quarterfinals
Saturday, 20 September 2014	18:00	Semifinals
Saturday, 20 September 2014	19:50	Gold medal match

== Results ==
Legend

- R — Retired

=== Preliminaries ===
==== Pool A ====
Athlete	KOR	CHN	SIN	VIE	INA	MGL
Kim Ji-yeon (KOR)	—	3–5	5–0	5–3	5–2	5–3
Li Fei (CHN)	5–3	—	5–1	5–4	5–0	5–4
Lau Ywen (SIN)	0–5	1–5	—	5–4	1–5	5–0
Nguyễn Thị Thanh Loan (VIE)	3–5	4–5	4–5	—	5–1	5–1
Diah Permatasari (INA)	2–5	0–5	5–1	2–5	—	5–3
Yundendorjiin Ariunzayaa (MGL)	3–5	4–5	0–5	1–5	3–5	—

==== Pool B ====
Athlete	CHN	JPN	KAZ	HKG	INA
Shen Chen (CHN)	—	5–4	5–1	5–2	5–3
Misaki Emura (JPN)	4–5	—	5–2	2–5	5–1
Yuliya Zhivitsa (KAZ)	1–5	2–5	—	5–0	5–1
Jenny Ho (HKG)	2–5	5–2	0–5	—	5–2
Reni Anggraini (INA)	3–5	1–5	1–5	2–5	—

==== Pool C ====
Athlete	KOR	KAZ	HKG	VIE	JPN
Lee Ra-jin (KOR)	—	5–3	3–5	5–4	5–1
Tamara Pochekutova (KAZ)	3–5	—	5–2	5–3	5–3
Au Sin Ying (HKG)	5–3	2–5	—	5–2	0–0^{R}
Nguyễn Thị Lệ Dung (VIE)	4–5	3–5	2–5	—	5–2
Risa Takashima (JPN)	1–5	3–5	0^{R}–0	2–5	—

==== Summary ====
Rank	Pool	Athlete	W	L	W/M	TD	TF
1	A	Li Fei (CHN)	5	0	1.000	+13	25
2	B	Shen Chen (CHN)	4	0	1.000	+10	20
3	A	Kim Ji-yeon (KOR)	4	1	0.800	+10	23
4	C	Tamara Pochekutova (KAZ)	3	1	0.750	+5	18
4	C	Lee Ra-jin (KOR)	3	1	0.750	+5	18
6	C	Au Sin Ying (HKG)	3	1	0.750	+2	12
7	B	Misaki Emura (JPN)	2	2	0.500	+3	16
8	B	Yuliya Zhivitsa (KAZ)	2	2	0.500	+2	13
9	B	Jenny Ho (HKG)	2	2	0.500	−2	12
10	A	Nguyễn Thị Thanh Loan (VIE)	2	3	0.400	+3	21
11	A	Diah Permatasari (INA)	2	3	0.400	−5	14
12	A	Lau Ywen (SIN)	2	3	0.400	−7	12
13	C	Nguyễn Thị Lệ Dung (VIE)	1	3	0.250	−3	14
14	B	Reni Anggraini (INA)	0	4	0.000	−13	7
15	A	Yundendorjiin Ariunzayaa (MGL)	0	5	0.000	−14	11
16	C	Risa Takashima (JPN)	0	4	0.000	−9	6

=== Knockout round ===
Round of 16
9	Jenny Ho (HKG)	8
8	Yuliya Zhivitsa (KAZ)	15
5	Lee Ra-jin (KOR)	15
12	Lau Ywen (SIN)	4
11	Diah Permatasari (INA)	9
6	Au Sin Ying (HKG)	15
7	Misaki Emura (JPN)	11
10	Nguyễn Thị Thanh Loan (VIE)	15

Quarterfinals
1	Li Fei (CHN)	15
8	Yuliya Zhivitsa (KAZ)	12
5	Lee Ra-jin (KOR)	15
4	Tamara Pochekutova (KAZ)	9
3	Kim Ji-yeon (KOR)	15
6	Au Sin Ying (HKG)	4
10	Nguyễn Thị Thanh Loan (VIE)	6
2	Shen Chen (CHN)	15

Semifinals
1	Li Fei (CHN)	7
5	Lee Ra-jin (KOR)	15
3	Kim Ji-yeon (KOR)	15
2	Shen Chen (CHN)	11

Gold medal match
5	Lee Ra-jin (KOR)	15
3	Kim Ji-yeon (KOR)	11

== Final standing ==
Rank	Athlete
1st place, gold medalist(s)	Lee Ra-jin (KOR)
2nd place, silver medalist(s)	Kim Ji-yeon (KOR)
3rd place, bronze medalist(s)	Li Fei (CHN)
3rd place, bronze medalist(s)	Shen Chen (CHN)
5	Tamara Pochekutova (KAZ)
6	Au Sin Ying (HKG)
7	Yuliya Zhivitsa (KAZ)
8	Nguyễn Thị Thanh Loan (VIE)
9	Misaki Emura (JPN)
10	Jenny Ho (HKG)
11	Diah Permatasari (INA)
12	Lau Ywen (SIN)
13	Nguyễn Thị Lệ Dung (VIE)
14	Reni Anggraini (INA)
15	Yundendorjiin Ariunzayaa (MGL)
16	Risa Takashima (JPN)
