= Gu Bon-gil =

South Korean fencer (born 1989)

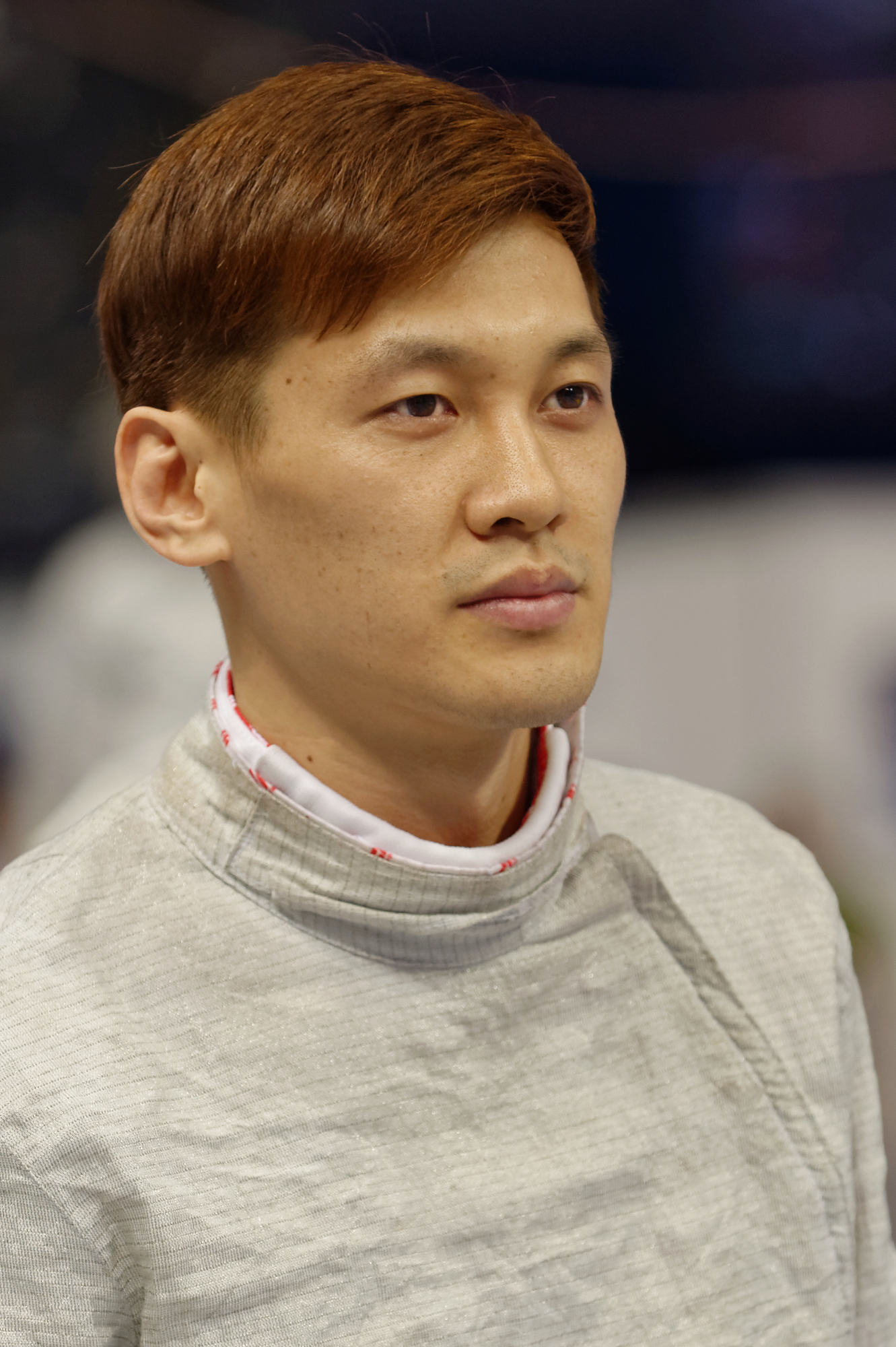
- Gu at the men's team sabre qualification stage of the 2015 World Fencing Championships on 16 July 2014

Personal information
- Born: 27 April 1989 (age 37) Daegu, South Korea
- Height: 1.82 m (6 ft 0 in)
- Weight: 70 kg (154 lb)

Fencing career
- Sport: Fencing
- Country: South Korea
- Weapon: Sabre
- Hand: right-handed
- Club: Korea Sports Promotion Foundation
- FIE ranking: current ranking
Medal record
Men's sabre
Representing South Korea
Event	1st	2nd	3rd
Olympic Games	3	0	0
Asian Games	6	2	0
World Championships	4	4	2
Asian Championships	14	4	0
Olympic Games
Gold medal – first place	2012 London	Team
Gold medal – first place	2020 Tokyo	Team
Gold medal – first place	2024 Paris	Team
World Championships
Gold medal – first place	2017 Leipzig	Team
Gold medal – first place	2018 Wuxi	Team
Gold medal – first place	2019 Budapest	Team
Gold medal – first place	2022 Cairo	Team
Silver medal – second place	2014 Kazan	Individual
Silver medal – second place	2014 Kazan	Team
Silver medal – second place	2017 Leipzig	Individual
Silver medal – second place	2023 Milan	Team
Bronze medal – third place	2011 Catania	Individual
Bronze medal – third place	2013 Budapest	Team
Asian Games
Gold medal – first place	2010 Guangzhou	Individual
Gold medal – first place	2014 Incheon	Individual
Gold medal – first place	2018 Jakarta	Individual
Gold medal – first place	2014 Incheon	Team
Gold medal – first place	2018 Jakarta	Team
Gold medal – first place	2022 Hangzhou	Team
Silver medal – second place	2010 Guangzhou	Team
Silver medal – second place	2022 Hangzhou	Individual
Asian Championships
Gold medal – first place	2010 Seoul	Individual
Gold medal – first place	2011 Seoul	Team
Gold medal – first place	2012 Wakayama	Individual
Gold medal – first place	2013 Shanghai	Individual
Gold medal – first place	2013 Shanghai	Team
Gold medal – first place	2014 Suwon	Individual
Gold medal – first place	2014 Suwon	Team
Gold medal – first place	2015 Singapore	Team
Gold medal – first place	2016 Wuxi	Team
Gold medal – first place	2017 Hong Kong	Individual
Gold medal – first place	2017 Hong Kong	Team
Gold medal – first place	2019 Chiba	Team
Gold medal – first place	2022 Seoul	Team
Gold medal – first place	2022 Seoul	Individual
Gold medal – first place	2024 Kuwait City	Team
Silver medal – second place	2010 Seoul	Team sabre
Silver medal – second place	2011 Seoul	Individual
Silver medal – second place	2012 Wakayama	Team
Silver medal – second place	2015 Singapore	Individual
Universiade
Gold medal – first place	2017 Taipei	Team
Silver medal – second place	2011 Shenzhen	Individual
Bronze medal – third place	2011 Shenzhen	Team

- Gu Bon-gil
- Hangul: 구본길
- Hanja: 具本佶
- RR: Gu Bongil
- MR: Ku Pon'gil

Gu Bon-gil (Korean: 구본길, Korean pronunciation: [ku.bon.ɡil] or [ku] [pon.ɡil]; born 27 April 1989) is a South Korean right-handed sabre fencer.

Gu is an eight-time team Asian champion, seven-time individual Asian champion, and three-time team world champion.

A three-time Olympian, Gu is a three-time team Olympic champion.

== Early life ==
A native of Daegu, Gu had played football all through elementary and middle school and went on to Osung High School, which was the alma mater of his 2012 Olympics teammate Oh Eun-seok. The fencing coach at Osung High School had already noticed him in middle school and persuaded him to switch sports. He majored in physical education at Dong-Eui University, then one of the few universities which had a fencing team.

Gu was already selected for the youth national teams as a high school student and participated in the 2006 Cadet (Under 17) World Championships. He won individual gold at the Junior (Under 20) World Championships and Junior Asian Championships in 2008.

== Career ==
Gu was first selected for the senior national team in 2010. He made headlines that year by winning two silver medals in the Grand Prix circuit and individual gold medals at both the Asian Games and Asian Championships. The media dubbed him the "scary rookie" after he narrowly defeated compatriot Oh Eun-seok, then world number 2, in the semi-finals of the Asian Games. His gold medal at the Asian Games meant that he was exempted from mandatory military service.

Gu won two individual gold medals at the 2010–11 Fencing World Cup and ended the competition ranked number 3 overall. He was selected to participate in the 2012 Summer Olympics along with Oh, Kim Jung-hwan and Won Woo-young. The Olympics began on a sour note as he, Kim and Won did not make it past the semi-final stage of the individual event. They managed to win a historic gold in the team event, South Korea's first ever Olympic gold medal in the men's team sabre category. The quartet continued to dominate in the team events, sweeping gold at both the Asian Championships and Asian Games hosted at home and winning silver at the World Championships. They also successfully defended their team gold medal at the 2015 Asian Fencing Championships.

Oh Eun-seok and Won Woo-young both retired and were replaced by youngsters Oh Sang-uk and Kim Jun-ho. There was no men's team sabre event at 2016 Summer Olympics due to the now-abolished rotation policy. Gu and Kim Jung-hwan both qualified for the individual event. However, he was narrowly defeated by Mojtaba Abedini, whom Kim went on to defeat in the bronze medal bout. The following year, the team won gold in the men's team sabre event at the 2017 World Fencing Championships, the country's first team gold at the worlds since 2005, and swept team gold at the 2018 World Championships and Asian Games. Gu himself won individual silver in the 2017 worlds and successfully defended his Asian Games gold the following year.

Kim Jung-hwan announced his retirement after the 2018 Asian Games and was replaced by Ha Han-sol. The team won gold at the 2019 World Fencing Championships, Gu's third consecutive team gold at the worlds. Kim came back out of retirement and reunited with the same team from the 2018 Asian Games and Asian Championships. They qualified for the 2020 Summer Olympics, which had been postponed for a year. Despite the disruption caused by the COVID-19 pandemic and changes to coaching staff, they won team gold, making Gu and Kim the first South Korean fencers (among all fencing disciplines, male or female) to win back-to-back team gold medals at the Olympics. (Note: 2016 Summer Olympics did not hold the men's team sabre following FIE's rotation system for team events.)

The 2021–22 World Cup season began uneventfully for Gu as he was not able to participate in the Orléans Grand Prix held in October, having tested positive for COVID-19 the day before the competition. He returned to the team which won gold at both the Men's Team World Cup in January and the World Championships to retain their #1 ranking in the team category. Gu himself finished that season on a high by winning gold at the Asian Championships and medalling for the first time at a Grand Prix event since 2018, only losing to Áron Szilágyi in the Padua Grand Prix final by a single point.

== Medal record ==
=== Olympic Games ===
Year	Location	Event	Position
2012	London, United Kingdom	Team Men's Sabre	1st
2021	Tokyo, Japan	Team Men's Sabre	1st
2024	Paris, France	Team Men's Sabre	1st

=== World Championship ===
Year	Location	Event	Position
2011	Catania, Italy	Individual Men's Sabre	3rd
2013	Budapest, Hungary	Team Men's Sabre	3rd
2014	Kazan, Russia	Individual Men's Sabre	2nd
2014	Kazan, Russia	Team Men's Sabre	2nd
2017	Leipzig, Germany	Individual Men's Sabre	2nd
2017	Leipzig, Germany	Team Men's Sabre	1st
2018	Wuxi, China	Team Men's Sabre	1st
2019	Budapest, Hungary	Team Men's Sabre	1st
2022	Cairo, Egypt	Team Men's Sabre	1st

=== Asian Championship ===
Year	Location	Event	Position
2010	Seoul, South Korea	Individual Men's Sabre	1st
2010	Seoul, South Korea	Team Men's Sabre	2nd
2011	Seoul, South Korea	Individual Men's Sabre	2nd
2011	Seoul, South Korea	Team Men's Sabre	1st
2012	Wakayama, Japan	Individual Men's Sabre	1st
2013	Shanghai, China	Individual Men's Sabre	1st
2013	Shanghai, China	Team Men's Sabre	1st
2014	Suwon, South Korea	Individual Men's Sabre	1st
2014	Suwon, South Korea	Team Men's Sabre	1st
2015	Singapore	Individual Men's Sabre	2nd
2015	Singapore	Team Men's Sabre	1st
2016	Wuxi, China	Team Men's Sabre	1st
2017	Hong Kong, China	Individual Men's Sabre	1st
2017	Hong Kong, China	Team Men's Sabre	1st
2018	Bangkok, Thailand	Individual Men's Sabre	1st
2018	Bangkok, Thailand	Team Men's Sabre	3rd
2019	Tokyo, Japan	Team Men's Sabre	1st
2022	Seoul, South Korea	Individual Men's Sabre	1st
2022	Seoul, South Korea	Team Men's Sabre	1st

=== Grand Prix ===
Date	Location	Event	Position
2010-02-05	Budapest, Hungary	Individual Men's Sabre	2nd
2010-03-21	Tunis, Tunisia	Individual Men's Sabre	2nd
2011-03-05	Budapest, Hungary	Individual Men's Sabre	3rd
2012-02-04	Plovdiv, Bulgaria	Individual Men's Sabre	2nd
2013-05-18	Warsaw, Poland	Individual Men's Sabre	3rd
2017-06-02	Moscow, Russia	Individual Men's Sabre	2nd
2017-12-15	Cancún, Mexico	Individual Men's Sabre	3rd
2018-05-11	Moscow, Russia	Individual Men's Sabre	3rd
2022-05-20	Padua, Italy	Individual Men's Sabre	2nd

=== World Cup ===
Date	Location	Event	Position
2010-05-22	Madrid, Spain	Individual Men's Sabre	2nd
2011-02-18	Padua, Italy	Individual Men's Sabre	1st
2011-03-18	Moscow, Russia	Individual Men's Sabre	1st
2011-06-24	(United States) New York City, New York	Individual Men's Sabre	3rd
2012-02-17	Padua, Italy	Individual Men's Sabre	3rd
2013-03-22	Moscow, Russia	Individual Men's Sabre	3rd
2013-04-26	Athens, Greece	Individual Men's Sabre	3rd
2014-02-14	Padua, Italy	Individual Men's Sabre	2nd
2014-11-21	Budapest, Hungary	Individual Men's Sabre	1st
2015-02-20	Warsaw, Poland	Individual Men's Sabre	1st
2015-05-01	Madrid, Spain	Individual Men's Sabre	1st
2016-02-19	Warsaw, Poland	Individual Men's Sabre	1st
2016-12-02	Győr, Hungary	Individual Men's Sabre	2nd
2017-02-24	Warsaw, Poland	Individual Men's Sabre	3rd
2018-02-23	Warsaw, Poland	Individual Men's Sabre	1st
2020-02-06	Luxembourg	Individual Men's Sabre	2nd
2022-05-08	Madrid, Spain	Team Men's Sabre	1st
2023-02-12	Warsaw, Poland	Team Men's Sabre	1st
2023-03-04	Padua, Italy	Team Men's Sabre	3rd

== Filmography ==
=== Television shows ===
Year	Title	Role	Notes	Ref.
2021	Playing Bro	Cast Member	Season 2	
2021	Golvengers	Cast Member		

== Personal life ==
Gu earned his master's degree from Kookmin University.

He married flight attendant Park Eun-ju in 2019. In November 2022, Gu announced his wife's pregnancy through a television program. His wife gave birth to a son on 6 March 2023.

Despite sharing the same family name and bon-gwan (Gu clan of Neungseong), Gu is not an immediate relative of singer and actor Gu Bon-seung or the Koo chaebol family associated with LG Corporation. He and Gu Bon-seung indicated through comments left on one another's official Instagram accounts that they were well aware of the rumors, quipping that it was "an honor" to be mistaken as relatives.

== Notes ==
Olympic Games
Preceded by Yoon Kyung-shin	Flagbearer for South Korea; Rio de Janeiro 2016	Succeeded by Kim Yeon-koung; Hwang Sun-woo
