= Farzad Baher =

Iranian fencer (born 1993)

Personal information
- Full name: Farzad Baher Arasbaran
- Nationality: Iranian
- Born: 24 November 1993 (age 32) Tabriz, Iran

Fencing career
- Sport: Fencing
- Weapon: sabre
- Hand: left-handed
- National coach: Peyman Fakhri
- Personal coach: Grigory Kiriyenko
Medal record
Men's sabre fencing
Representing Iran
Asian Games
Silver medal – second place	2014 Incheon	Team
Silver medal – second place	2018 Jakarta–Palembang	Team
Bronze medal – third place	2022 Hangzhou	Team
Asian Championships
Silver medal – second place	2015 Singapore	Team
Silver medal – second place	2024 Kuwait City	Team
Bronze medal – third place	2014 Suwon	Team

Farzad Baher Arasbaran (Persian: فرزاد باهر ارسباران; born 24 November 1993) is an Iranian sabre fencer and was also a member of the Iranian sabre fence in 2013 Budapest and 2014 Kazan.
