= Hao Jialu =

Chinese fencer (born 1987)

Hao Jialu 郝佳露
Personal information
- Nationality: Chinese
- Born: 20 August 1987 (age 38) Taiyuan, Shanxi
- Height: 1.76 m (5 ft 9 in)
- Weight: 66 kg (146 lb)

Sport
- Country: China
- Sport: Fencing
Medal record
Women's épée
Olympic Games
Silver medal – second place	2016 Rio de Janeiro	Team
World Championships
Gold medal – first place	2015 Moscow	Team

Hao Jialu (Chinese: 郝佳露; pinyin: Hǎo Jiālù; born 20 August 1987 in Taiyuan, Shanxi) is a Chinese fencer. She represented her country at the 2016 Summer Olympics, where she won the silver medal in the women's team épée event.
