= Jiao Yunlong =

Chinese fencer

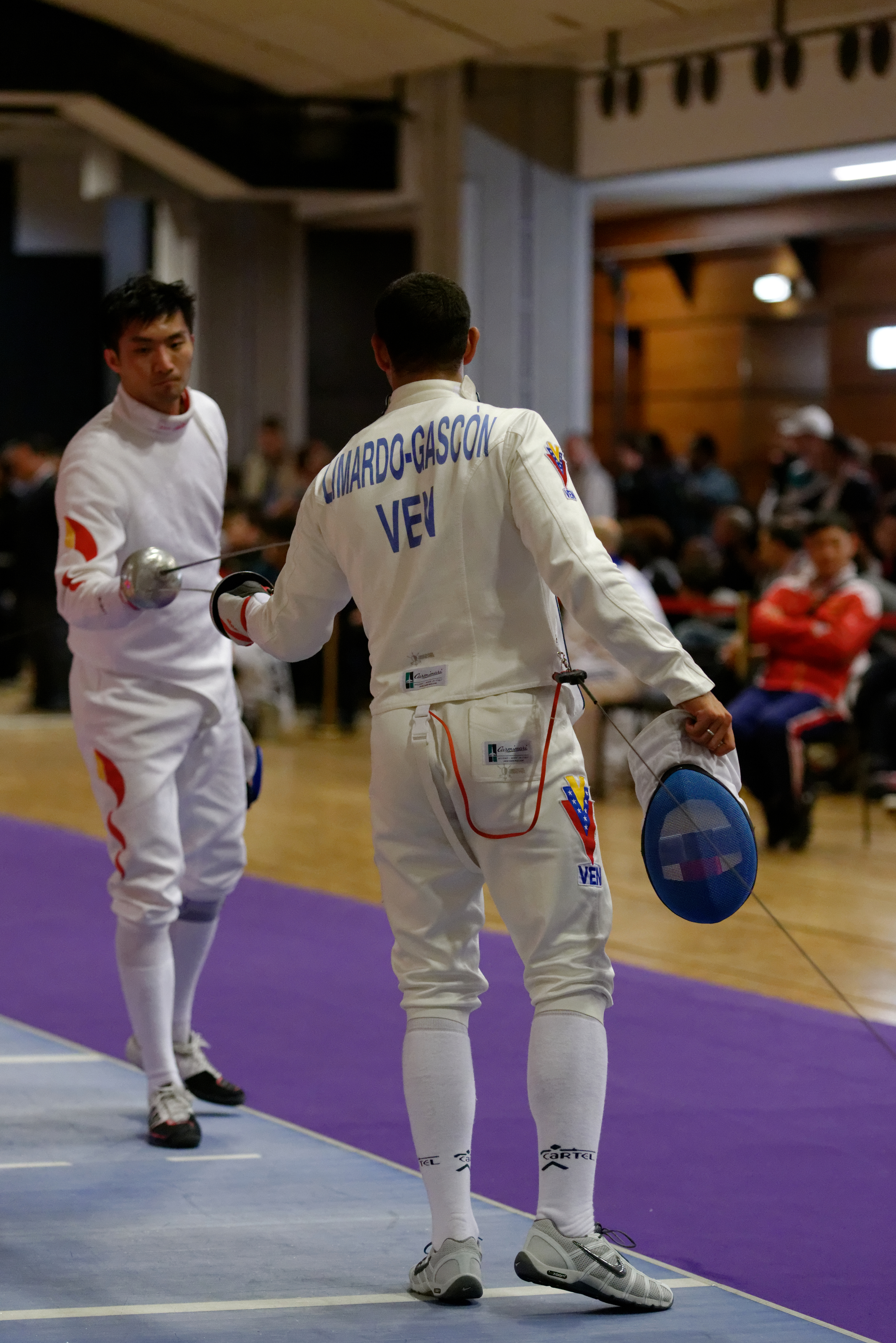
- Jiao (left) against Rubén Limardo in 2013

Personal information
- Born: 19 May 1988 (age 36)

Sport
- Sport: Fencing

Jiao Yunlong (born 19 May 1988) is a Chinese fencer. He competed in the men's épée event at the 2016 Summer Olympics.
