= Shen Chen =

Chinese fencer (born 1990)

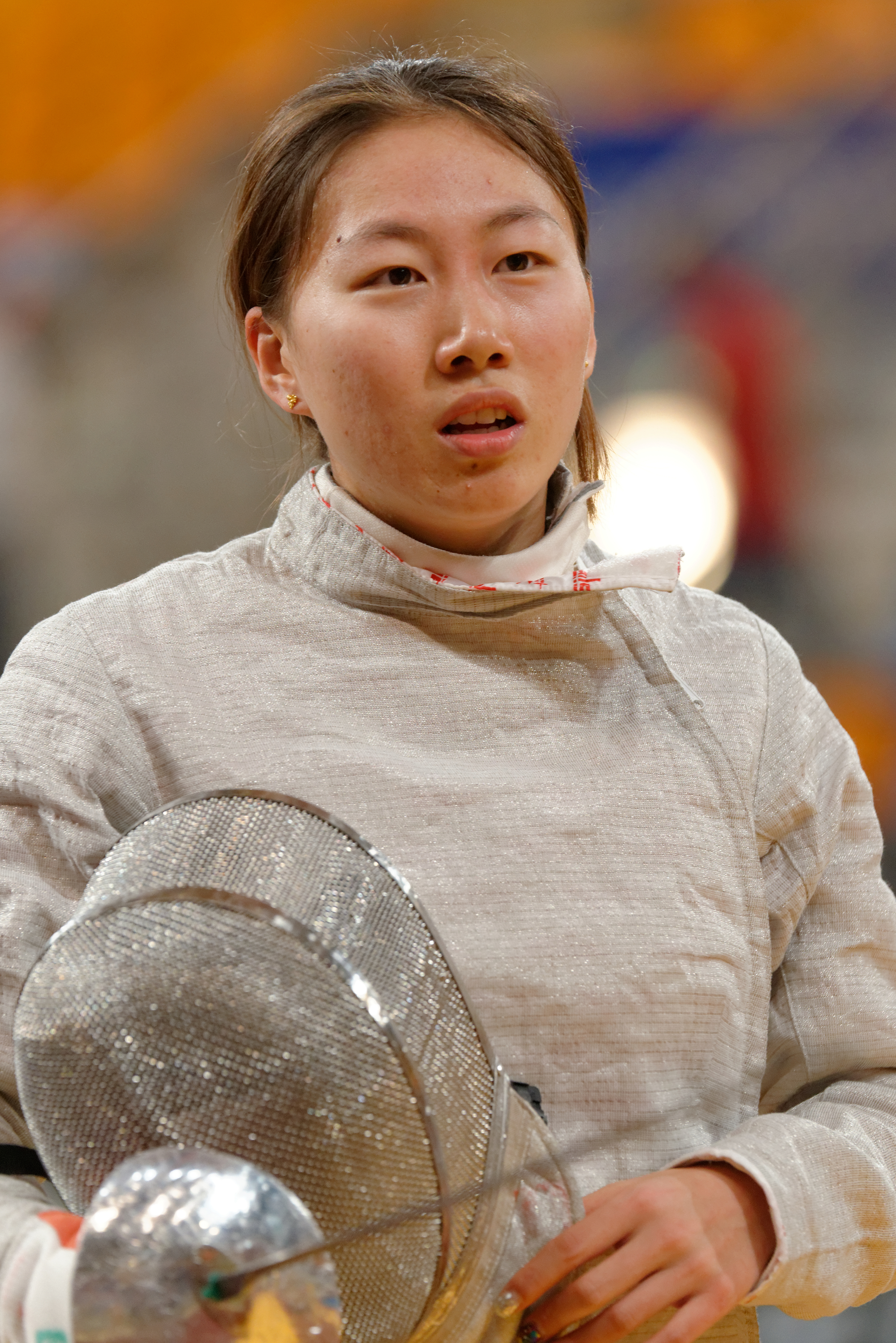

Personal information
- Nationality: Chinese
- Born: 28 July 1990 (age 35)
- Height: 1.70 m (5 ft 7 in)
- Weight: 75 kg (165 lb)

Fencing career
- Sport: Fencing
- Weapon: sabre
- Hand: right-handed
- FIE ranking: current ranking
Medal record
World Championships
Bronze medal – third place	2015 Moscow	Individual
Asian Championships
Gold medal – first place	2014 Suwon	Team
Gold medal – first place	2015 Singapore	Individual
Silver medal – second place	2013 Shanghai	Team
Silver medal – second place	2015 Singapore	Team
Bronze medal – third place	2013 Shanghai	Individual
Bronze medal – third place	2014 Suwon	Individual

Shen Chen (Chinese: 沈晨; pinyin: Shěn Chén; born 28 July 1990) is a Chinese sabre fencer.

Shen won a bronze medal in the 2013 and 2014 Asian Fencing Championships. In the 2013–14 season, she also earned a bronze medal at the Antalya World Cup and a silver medal at the Beijing Grand Prix. In the 2014–15 season she won the gold medal at the 2015 Asian Fencing Championships.
