= Kim Jung-hwan (fencer) =

South Korean fencer (born 1983)

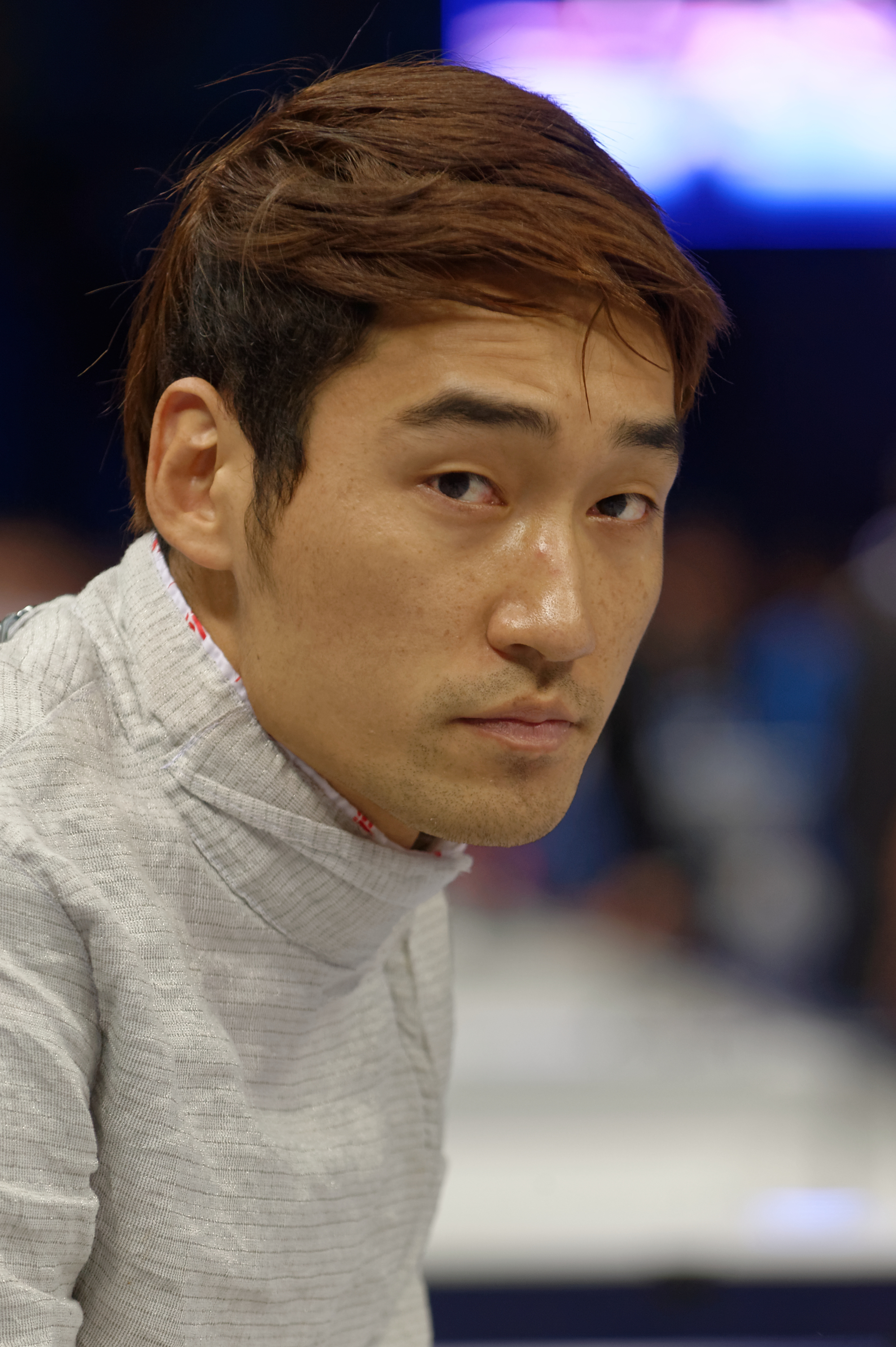
- Kim in 2015

Personal information
- Nationality: South Korean
- Born: September 2, 1983 (age 43) Seoul, South Korea
- Height: 178 cm (5 ft 10 in)
- Weight: 66 kg (146 lb)

Fencing career
- Sport: Fencing
- Country: South Korea
- Weapon: Sabre
- Hand: Right-handed
- Club: Korea Sports Promotion Foundation
- Head coach: Kim Du-hong
- Former coach: Lee Hyo-kun
- FIE ranking: current ranking
Medal record
Men's sabre
Representing South Korea
Event	1st	2nd	3rd
Olympic Games	2	0	2
Asian Games	3	2	0
World Championships	4	1	1
Asian Championships	10	7	4
Olympic Games
Gold medal – first place	2012 London	Team
Gold medal – first place	2020 Tokyo	Team
Bronze medal – third place	2016 Rio de Janeiro	Individual
Bronze medal – third place	2020 Tokyo	Individual
World Championships
Gold medal – first place	2017 Leipzig	Team
Gold medal – first place	2018 Wuxi	Individual
Gold medal – first place	2018 Wuxi	Team
Gold medal – first place	2022 Cairo	Team
Silver medal – second place	2014 Kazan	Team
Bronze medal – third place	2013 Budapest	Team
Asian Games
Gold medal – first place	2014 Incheon	Team
Gold medal – first place	2018 Jakarta	Team
Gold medal – first place	2022 Hangzhou	Team
Silver medal – second place	2014 Incheon	Individual
Silver medal – second place	2010 Guangzhou	Team
Asian Championships
Gold medal – first place	2009 Doha	Individual
Gold medal – first place	2011 Seoul	Team
Gold medal – first place	2013 Shanghai	Team
Gold medal – first place	2014 Suwon	Team
Gold medal – first place	2015 Singapore	Individual
Gold medal – first place	2015 Singapore	Team
Gold medal – first place	2016 Wuxi	Individual
Gold medal – first place	2016 Wuxi	Team
Gold medal – first place	2017 Hong Kong	Team
Gold medal – first place	2022 Seoul	Team
Silver medal – second place	2007 Nantong	Team
Silver medal – second place	2008 Bangkok	Team
Silver medal – second place	2010 Seoul	Team
Silver medal – second place	2012 Wakayama	Team
Silver medal – second place	2013 Shanghai	Individual
Silver medal – second place	2018 Bangkok	Individual
Silver medal – second place	2022 Seoul	Individual
Bronze medal – third place	2007 Nantong	Individual
Bronze medal – third place	2009 Doha	Team
Bronze medal – third place	2012 Wakayama	Individual
Bronze medal – third place	2018 Bangkok	Team
Universiade
Silver medal – second place	2007 Bangkok	Team
Bronze medal – third place	2007 Bangkok	Individual

- Kim Jung-hwan
- Hangul: 김정환
- Hanja: 金政煥
- RR: Gim Jeonghwan
- MR: Kim Chŏnghwan

Kim Jung-hwan (Korean: 김정환; Hanja: 金政煥; born September 2, 1983) is a South Korean retired right-handed sabre fencer.

Kim is a seven-time team Asian champion, two-time individual Asian champion, two-time team world champion, and 2018 individual world champion.

A three-time Olympian, Kim is a two-time individual Olympic bronze medalist, and two-time team Olympic champion.

Kim is the first Asian fencer to win four Olympic medals; the first South Korean fencer to medal at three consecutive Olympic Games; and the first South Korean fencer across all disciplines to win a medal in both the individual and team events in a single Olympic Games.

== Early life ==
Kim played baseball throughout elementary school and had aspired to become a baseball player, having been a fan of KBO League team LG Twins since childhood. In 1996, he was introduced to fencing by a friend and took up the sport after his middle school physical education teacher advised him that his long arms would be more suitable for fencing. He was schoolmates with future national teammate Won Woo-young at Hongik University High School, then one of the few schools in Seoul which had a fencing team, and graduated from Korea National Sport University.

== Career ==
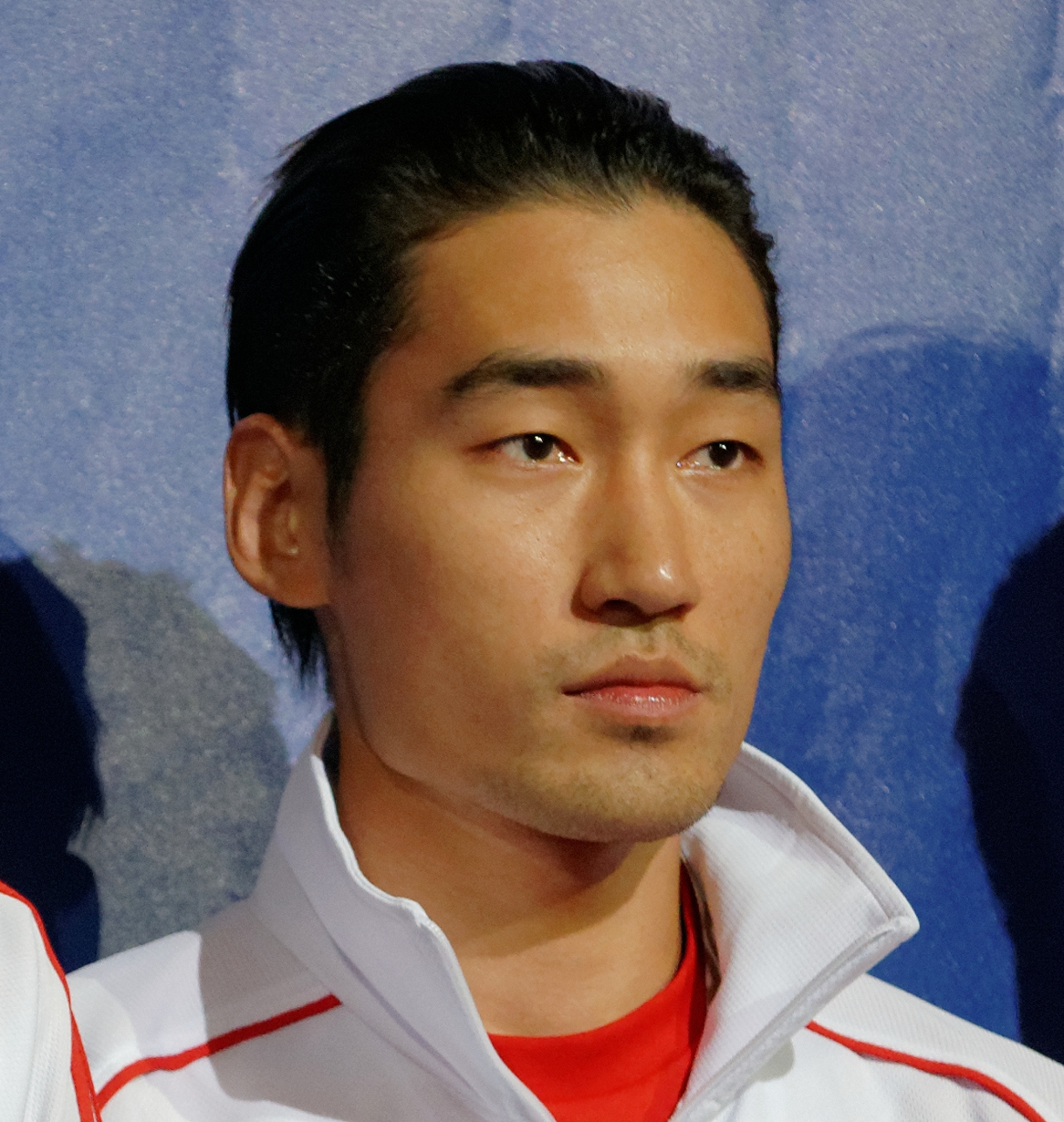
Kim Jung-hwan (2013)

Kim was first selected for the senior national team in 2004 and won gold at the Seoul Grand Prix in 2005 despite being a relative newcomer. However, his medal was forfeited and he was suspended for a year after failing a doping test, which he unsuccessfully argued was due to medication he had taken at home to treat his insomnia. After serving out his suspension, he returned and won medals in the Grand Prix circuit and the 2007 Summer Universiade but failed to qualify for the 2008 Summer Olympics. The slump in form coupled by the sudden death of his father, who he was close to, in 2009 nearly led him to quit the sport altogether. He enlisted for mandatory military service in January 2010 and was assigned to the Korea Armed Forces Athletic Corps. He was temporarily released to participate in the 2010 Asian Games, winning silver in the team event. At the 2012 Summer Olympics, he won a gold medal in the men's team sabre event together with Won Woo-young, Oh Eun-seok and Gu Bon-gil. In the individual event he was defeated in the second round. The quartet continued to dominate in the team events, sweeping gold at both the Asian Championships and Asian Games hosted at home and winning silver at the World Championships.

In the 2014–15 Fencing World Cup, Kim won gold at the New York Grand Prix in individual men's sabre, and finished the season ranked world #2 behind Gu. Kim and his teammates had a disappointing run at the 2015 World Championships, as they were each eliminated in the quarter-finals of the individual event as well as the team event. They bounced back to defend their team gold at the Asian Championships weeks later. In the individual event, Kim defeated Gu in the final and claimed his second individual gold of the Asian Championships.

Kim qualified for the 2016 Summer Olympics, having finished the 2015–16 World Cup season ranked world #1 and won gold medals at the Moscow Grand Prix and in both the team and individual events at the Asian Championships in Wuxi. There was no men's sabre team event at the Olympics as it was not in rotation for that edition. With his bronze medal win, he became the first South Korean male sabre fencer to win an individual medal at the Olympics and dedicated his win to his late father. He was awarded the Order of Sports Merit Cheongnyong (청룡장; English: Blue Dragon) class, the South Korean government's highest honor bestowed on professional athletes who meet the criteria.

In 2018, he and his teammates Gu, Oh Sang-uk and Kim Jun-ho, swept gold in the team sabre event at both the World Championships and the Asian Games. Kim also won gold in the individual event at the World Championships, his first ever World Championships individual gold. The Asian Games was his last major international tournament as he officially announced his retirement from the national team that December.

Kim remained with the Korea Sports Promotion Foundation as a "player-coach". At Gu's persuasion, he returned to the national team and qualified in time for the Seoul Grand Prix held in April 2019, winning bronze. He joined the same teammates from the 2018 World Championships and Asian Games and they qualified for the 2020 Summer Olympics, which was later postponed for a year due to the COVID-19 pandemic. For a period of time, he had to double as the team's coach due to their coach being dismissed and the federation being unable to find a replacement immediately. Despite the disruption, the quartet successfully defended their gold medal. He was the only member to medal in the individual event as Gu was knocked out in the Round of 32 while Oh failed to advance to the semi-finals in a shock loss to Sandro Bazadze, whom Kim went on to defeat in the bronze medal bout. His two medals at the 2020 Olympics made him the first South Korean fencer (male or female, across all three disciplines) to win a medal at three consecutive Olympic Games.

Following on his success at the Olympics, Kim began the 2021–22 World Cup season with a gold medal at the Orléans Grand Prix in November 2021, his first gold in a Grand Prix since 2017. This was followed by individual bronze medals at two other World Cup events. He won silver in the individual event of the 2022 Asian Championships, losing to Gu for a second time in a row at the championship final. During the 2022 World Championships, his performance was hindered by a back injury and he was eliminated during the Round of 32 in the individual event and missed the final match of the team event. He was also part of the team that won gold at the Asian Championships and two other World Cup events, allowing them to retain their #1 ranking in the team category for the season.

== Post-retirement ==
Kim retired after the 2023-24 season and became a commentator covering both international and domestic competitions. He joined former teammate Kim Jun-ho as the commentators alongside veteran sportscaster Choi Seung-don for both the men's and women's sabre events at the 2024 Summer Olympics.

In August 2026, Kim joined the faculty at his alma mater Korea National Sport University as a full-time lecturer.

== Personal life ==
Kim married Byun Jung-eun in September 2020. Their son Ro-yi was born in April 2022.

Kim earned a master's degree in sports industry studies at Kookmin University. He completed his doctoral studies at Kyonggi University in 2025.

== Medal record ==
=== Olympic Games ===
Year	Location	Event	Position
2012	London, United Kingdom	Team Men's Sabre	1st
2016	Rio de Janeiro, Brazil	Individual Men's Sabre	3rd
2021	Tokyo, Japan	Individual Men's Sabre	3rd
2021	Tokyo, Japan	Team Men's Sabre	1st

=== World Championship ===
Year	Location	Event	Position
2013	Budapest, Hungary	Team Men's Sabre	3rd
2014	Kazan, Russia	Team Men's Sabre	2nd
2017	Leipzig, Germany	Team Men's Sabre	1st
2018	Wuxi, China	Individual Men's Sabre	1st
2018	Wuxi, China	Team Men's Sabre	1st
2022	Cairo, Egypt	Team Men's Sabre	1st

=== Asian Championship ===
Year	Location	Event	Position
2007	Nantong, China	Team Men's Sabre	2nd
2007	Nantong, China	Individual Men's Sabre	3rd
2008	Bangkok, Thailand	Team Men's Sabre	2nd
2010	Seoul, South Korea	Team Men's Sabre	2nd
2011	Seoul, South Korea	Team Men's Sabre	1st
2012	Wakayama, Japan	Individual Men's Sabre	3rd
2012	Wakayama, Japan	Team Men's Sabre	2nd
2013	Shanghai, China	Individual Men's Sabre	2nd
2013	Shanghai, China	Team Men's Sabre	1st
2014	Suwon, South Korea	Team Men's Sabre	1st
2015	Singapore	Individual Men's Sabre	1st
2015	Singapore	Team Men's Sabre	1st
2016	Wuxi, China	Individual Men's Sabre	1st
2016	Wuxi, China	Team Men's Sabre	1st
2017	Hong Kong, China	Team Men's Sabre	1st
2018	Bangkok, Thailand	Individual Men's Sabre	2nd
2018	Bangkok, Thailand	Team Men's Sabre	3rd
2022	Seoul, South Korea	Individual Men's Sabre	2nd
2022	Seoul, South Korea	Team Men's Sabre	1st

=== Grand Prix ===
Date	Location	Event	Position
2007-03-02	Plovdiv, Bulgaria	Individual Men's Sabre	3rd
2014-03-08	Budapest, Hungary	Individual Men's Sabre	1st
2014-05-24	Plovdiv, Bulgaria	Individual Men's Sabre	3rd
2014-12-13	(United States) New York, New York	Individual Men's Sabre	1st
2016-05-27	Moscow, Russia	Individual Men's Sabre	1st
2017-03-31	Seoul, South Korea	Individual Men's Sabre	1st
2017-06-02	Moscow, Russia	Individual Men's Sabre	3rd
2018-03-30	Seoul, South Korea	Individual Men's Sabre	2nd
2019-04-26	Seoul, South Korea	Individual Men's Sabre	3rd
2021-11-11	Orléans, France	Individual Men's Sabre	1st
2022-12-08	Orléans, France	Individual Men's Sabre	3rd

=== World Cup ===
Date	Location	Event	Position
2007-05-19	Warsaw, Poland	Individual Men's Sabre	1st
2012-06-22	(United States) Chicago, Illinois	Individual Men's Sabre	2nd
2014-02-07	Madrid, Spain	Individual Men's Sabre	1st
2014-03-21	Moscow, Russia	Individual Men's Sabre	2nd
2014-04-25	Athens, Greece	Individual Men's Sabre	2nd
2015-01-30	Padua, Italy	Individual Men's Sabre	3rd
2015-10-30	Budapest, Hungary	Individual Men's Sabre	2nd
2016-01-29	Padua, Italy	Individual Men's Sabre	3rd
2016-05-13	Madrid, Spain	Individual Men's Sabre	3rd
2017-02-03	Padua, Italy	Individual Men's Sabre	3rd
2017-02-24	Warsaw, Poland	Individual Men's Sabre	1st
2019-11-15	Cairo, Egypt	Individual Men's Sabre	3rd
2022-01-15	(Georgia (country)) Tbilisi, Georgia	Individual Men's Sabre	3rd
2022-03-18	Budapest, Hungary	Individual Men's Sabre	3rd
2022-05-06	Madrid, Spain	Individual Men's Sabre	3rd
2022-05-08	Madrid, Spain	Team Men's Sabre	1st
2023-03-04	Padua, Italy	Team Men's Sabre	3rd
