= Kenta Tokunan =

Japanese fencer (born 1987)

Personal information
- Born: 17 August 1987 (age 38) Fukui Prefecture, Japan
- Height: 183 cm (6 ft 0 in)
- Weight: 83 kg (183 lb)

Fencing career
- Sport: Fencing
- Weapon: sabre
Medal record
Men's sabre (fencing)
Asian Fencing Championships
Silver medal – second place	2014 Suwon	Team sabre
Bronze medal – third place	2010 Seoul	Team sabre
Bronze medal – third place	2013 Shanghai	Team sabre
Bronze medal – third place	2015 Singapore	Team sabre
Bronze medal – third place	2018 Bangkok	Team sabre
Bronze medal – third place	2019 Chiba	Team sabre

Kenta Tokunan (徳南 堅太, Tokunan Kenta; born 17 August 1987) is a Japanese fencer. He competed in the men's sabre event at the 2016 Summer Olympics.
