= Liu Yongshi =

Chinese fencer

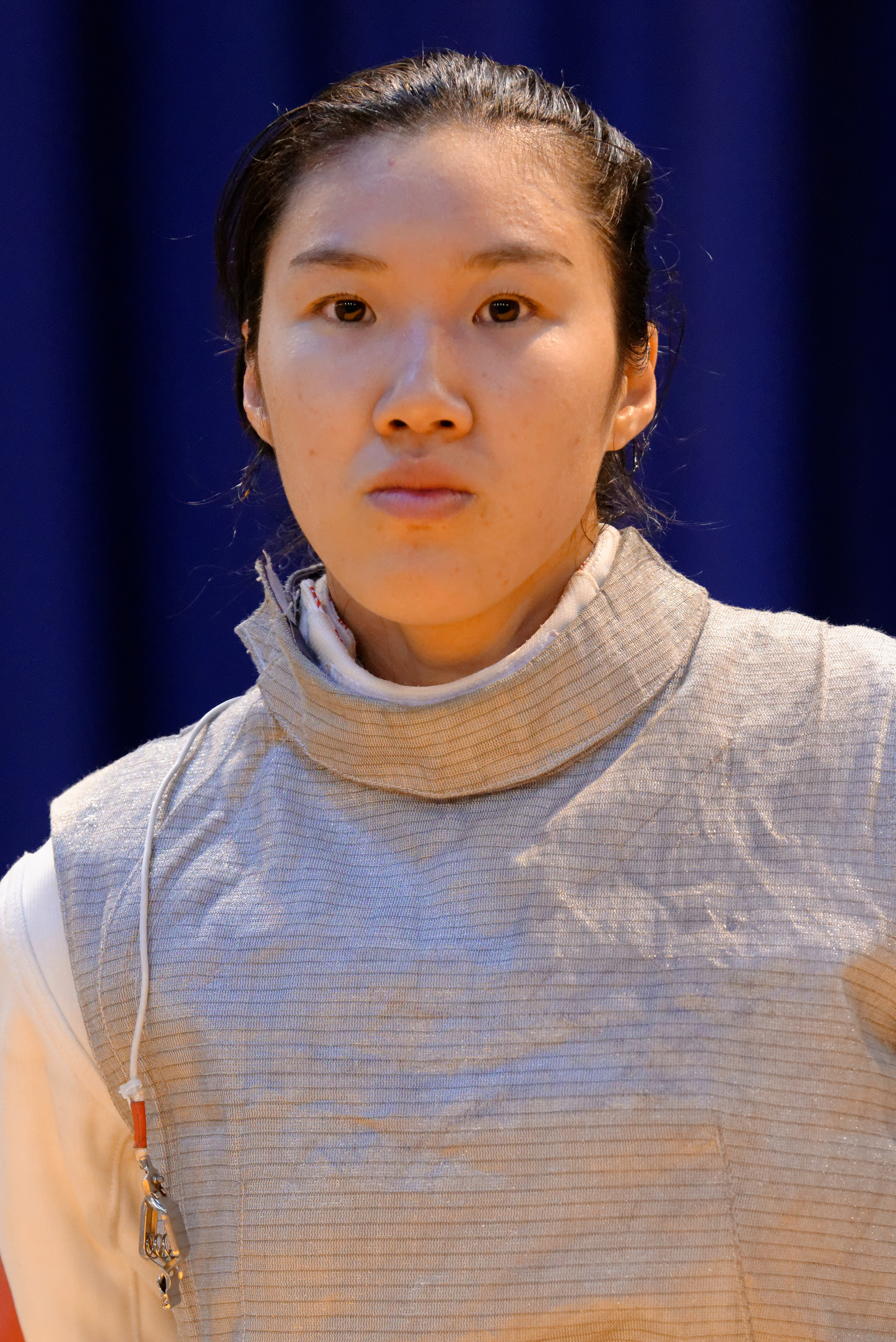

Personal information
- Nationality: Chinese
- Born: 19 February 1990 (age 36)
- Height: 177 cm (5 ft 10 in)
- Weight: 65 kg (143 lb)

Sport
- Sport: Fencing

Liu Yongshi (Simplified Chinese:刘 咏诗, born 19 February 1990) is a Chinese fencer from Guangzhou. She competed in the women's foil event at the 2016 Summer Olympics.
