= Mojtaba Abedini =

Iranian sabre fencer (born 1984)

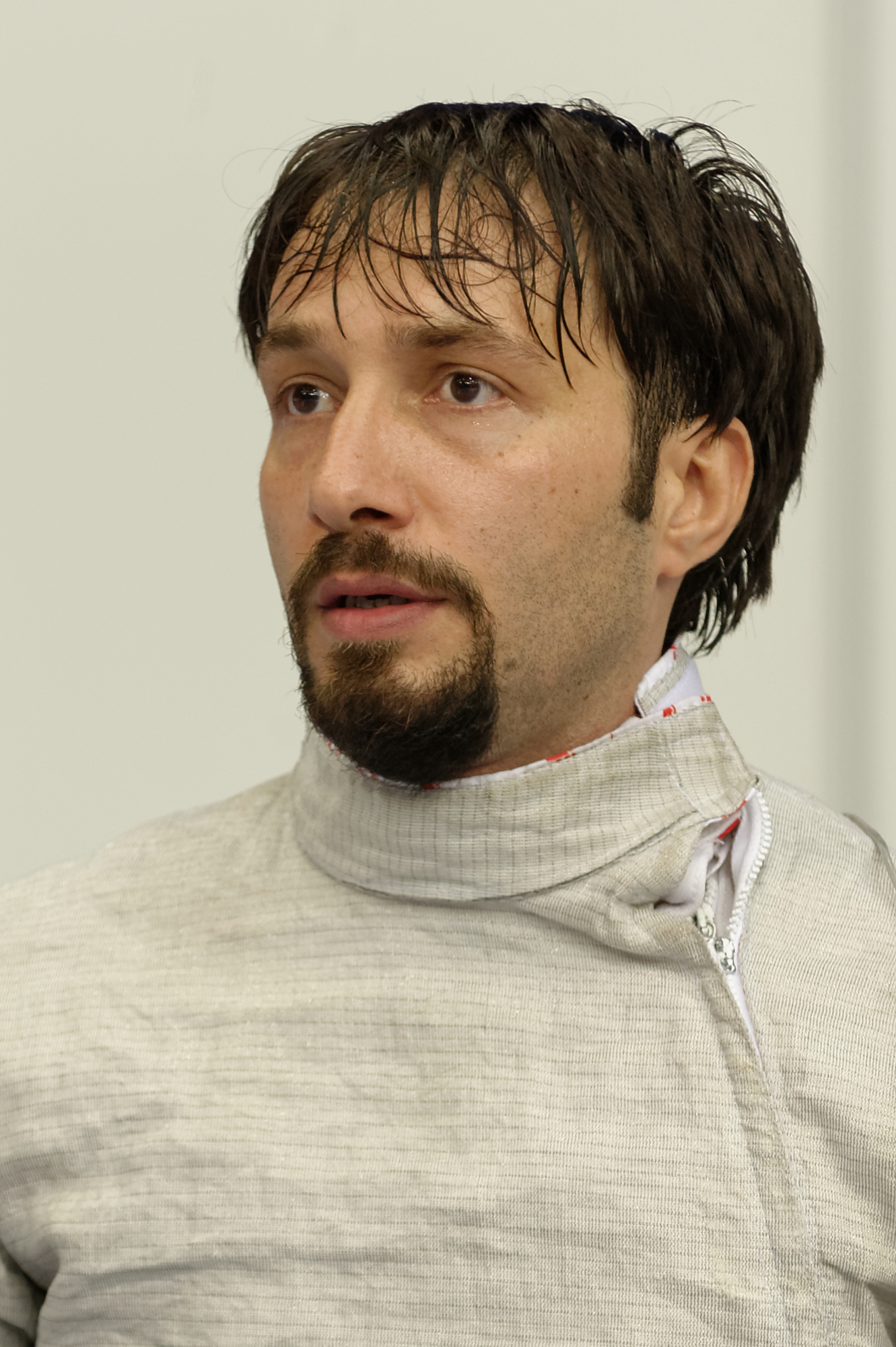

Personal information
- Full name: Mojtaba Abedini Shourmasti
- Born: مجتبی عابدینی شورمستی; 11 August 1984 (age 41) Tehran, Iran
- Height: 1.76 m (5 ft 9 in)
- Weight: 80 kg (176 lb)

Fencing career
- Sport: Fencing
- Country: Iran
- Weapon: Sabre
- Hand: right-handed
- National coach: Peyman Fakhri, Amin Ghorbani
- FIE ranking: current ranking
Medal record
Men's sabre fencing
Representing Iran
World Championships
Bronze medal – third place	2019 Budapest	Individual
Asian Games
Silver medal – second place	2014 Incheon	Team
Silver medal – second place	2018 Jakarta–Palembang	Team
Asian Championships
Silver medal – second place	2013 Shanghai	Team
Silver medal – second place	2014 Suwon	Individual
Silver medal – second place	2015 Singapore	Team
Silver medal – second place	2017 Hong Kong	Team
Silver medal – second place	2018 Bangkok	Team
Silver medal – second place	2019 Chiba	Team
Bronze medal – third place	2003 Chiang Mai	Team
Bronze medal – third place	2004 Manila	Individual
Bronze medal – third place	2004 Manila	Team
Bronze medal – third place	2005 Kota Kinabalu	Individual
Bronze medal – third place	2005 Kota Kinabalu	Team
Bronze medal – third place	2007 Nantong	Team
Bronze medal – third place	2008 Bangkok	Team
Bronze medal – third place	2010 Seoul	Team
Bronze medal – third place	2012 Wakayama	Team
Bronze medal – third place	2013 Shanghai	Individual
Bronze medal – third place	2014 Suwon	Team
Bronze medal – third place	2015 Singapore	Individual
Bronze medal – third place	2019 Chiba	Individual
Islamic Solidarity Games
Gold medal – first place	2005 Saudi Arabia	Individual
Silver medal – second place	2005 Saudi Arabia	Team
West Asian Games
Gold medal – first place	2002 Kuwait City	Team
Gold medal – first place	2005 Doha	Individual
Silver medal – second place	2002 Kuwait City	Individual

Mojtaba Abedini Shourmasti (Persian: مجتبی عابدینی شورمستی; born 11 August 1984) is an Iranian 3-time Olympian sabre fencer. He won a bronze medal at the 2019 World Fencing Championships, becoming the first-ever Iranian fencer to win a medal at the World Fencing Championships.

== Early life ==
Abedini was born in Tehran, Iran. He has a master's degree in Sport Administration/Management from the University of Tehran ('14), and speaks English and Persian. His wife is Narges Faal, and he has two daughters.

== Fencing career ==
Abedini won a bronze medal at the 2019 World Fencing Championships in Budapest, Hungary, losing only to Hungarian former world champion András Szatmári, becoming the first-ever Iranian fencer to win a medal at the World Fencing Championships.

He qualified to compete in the men's sabre event of the 2012 Summer Olympics through a zone tournament held in Wakayama City, Japan, becoming the first Iranian fencer to compete at the Olympics. Abedini was defeated in the first round by Romania's Florin Zalomir, and came in 37th in individual sabre.

He also competed in men's individual sabre event at the 2016 Summer Olympics, coming in fourth. He reached the semifinals by a series of fine performances against the likes of Andriy Yahodka, Gu Bon-gil, and Vincent Anstett but missed the chance to go on the podium when he was defeated by American Daryl Homer in the semifinals and Korean Kim Jung-hwan in the bronze medal match.

Abedini competed at the 2020 Summer Olympics, coming in 11th in individual sabre and 6th in team sabre. He was captain of the Iranian sabre team, which appeared in the Olympics for the first time ever.

Starting in 2021 he also served as a coach of the Iranian national youth fencing team.

After the September 2022 death of 22-year-old Mahsa Amini in Iran under suspicious circumstances, following her arrest by the Guidance Patrol, the Islamic morality police of Iran's Law Enforcement Command, for not wearing a hijab in accordance with government standards, Abedini resigned fencing under the Iranian team, writing:

"Every time I played for the national team, it was with all my heart, because it was and is the first and last reason for the victory of the people of the land. The people of my land are being disrespected and beaten. I consider it my duty to express my sympathy and companionship with them. I must say goodbye to the Iranian national team forever out of respect for women and my country."

== See also ==
- List of Asian Games medalists in fencing
