= Xu Yingming =

Chinese fencer (born 1992)

Personal information
- Native name: 许英明
- Born: 22 January 1992 (age 34)

Fencing career
- Sport: Fencing
- Country: China
- Weapon: Sabre
- Hand: Right-handed

Xu Yingming (Chinese: 许英明, born 22 January 1992) is a Chinese fencer. He won one of the bronze medals in the men's team sabre event at the 2018 Asian Games held in Jakarta, Indonesia. Four years earlier, he also won one of the bronze medals in the same event at the 2014 Asian Games held in Incheon, South Korea. He has also won medals at several editions of the Asian Fencing Championships.

He competed in the men's sabre event at the World Fencing Championships in 2014, 2015, 2018 and 2019.
