= Lam Hin Chung =

Hong Kong fencer (born 1986)

Lam Hin Chung (Chinese: 林衍聰; Jyutping: lam^{4} hin^{2} cung^{1}, born 4 November 1986, Hong Kong) is a Hong Kong fencer. At the 2012 Summer Olympics, he competed in the Men's sabre, but was defeated in the first round.
