= Tomohiro Shimamura =

Japanese fencer

Personal information
- Nationality: Japan
- Born: 13 February 1984 (age 42) Tokyo, Japan

Sport
- Sport: Fencing

Tomohiro Shimamura (born 13 February 1984) is a Japanese sabre fencer. He competed in the 2020 Summer Olympics.
