= Sun Wei (fencer) =

Chinese fencer

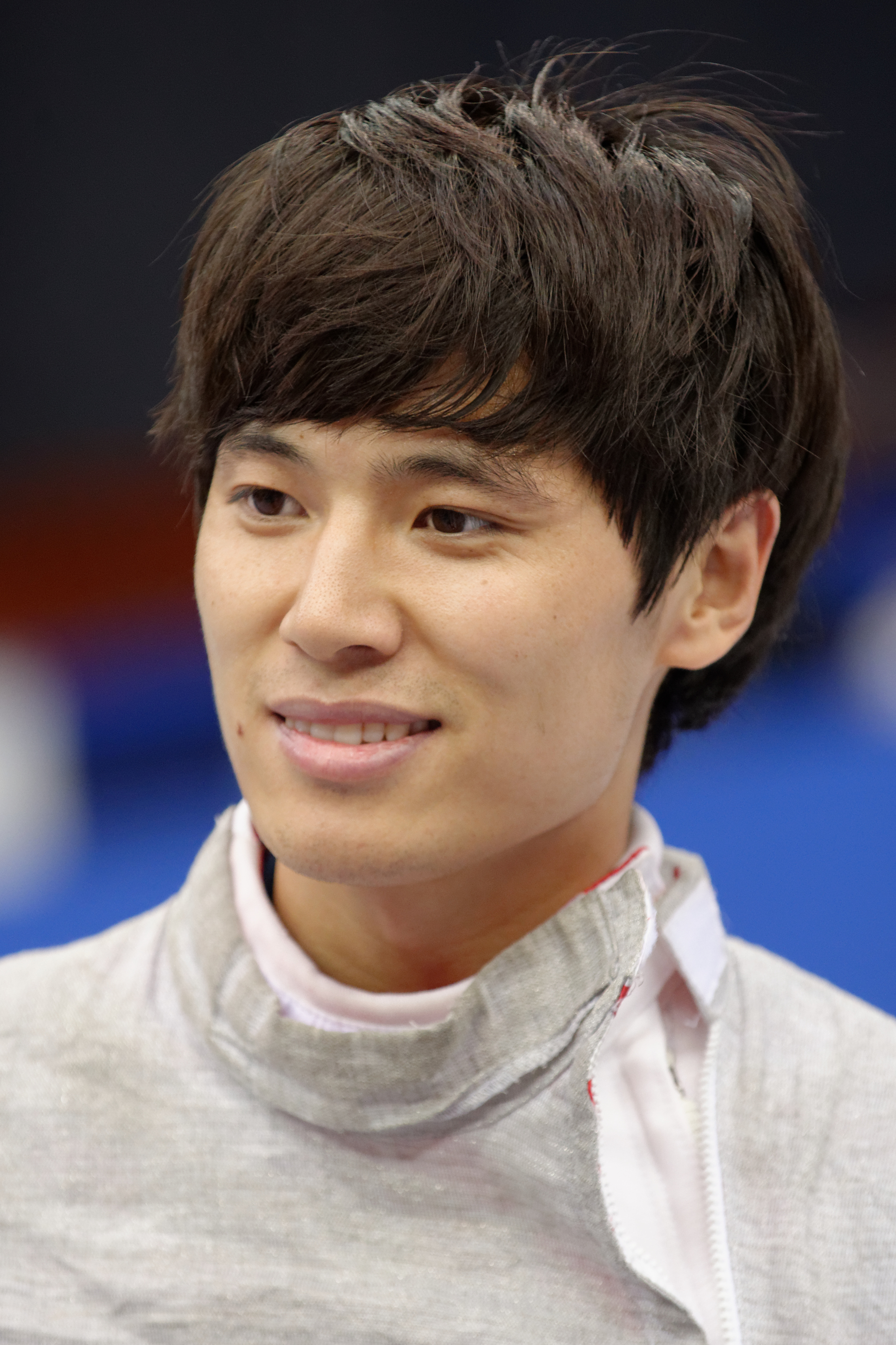
- Sun Wei at the 2015 World Fencing Championships

Personal information
- Nationality: Chinese
- Born: 27 October 1992 (age 32)

Sport
- Sport: Fencing

Sun Wei (Chinese: 孙伟; born 27 October 1992) is a Chinese fencer. He competed in the men's sabre event at the 2016 Summer Olympics.
