= Asian Fencing Championships =

Annual fencing competition

Asian Fencing Championships is the fencing zonal championship organized by the Asian Fencing Confederation for the Asia-Oceania zone. The first Asian Fencing Championships was held in 1973 in Tehran, however, fencing in the continent did not proceed actively enough. The tournament restarted in 1989 and it has been held annually since 2007. It awards points for the Fencing World Cup.

== Editions ==
	Year	Host
–	1973	Tehran, Iran
1	1989	Beijing, China
2	1991	Kuala Lumpur, Malaysia
3	1993	Tokyo, Japan
4	1995	Seoul, South Korea
5	1997	Tehran, Iran (Men); Nanjing, China (Women)
6	1999	Nanjing, China
7	2001	Bangkok, Thailand
8	2003	Chiang Mai, Thailand
9	2004	Manila, Philippines
10	2005	Kota Kinabalu, Malaysia
11	2007	Nantong, China
12	2008	Bangkok, Thailand
13	2009	Doha, Qatar
14	2010	Seoul, South Korea
15	2011	Seoul, South Korea
16	2012	Wakayama, Japan
17	2013	Shanghai, China
18	2014	Suwon, South Korea
19	2015	Singapore
20	2016	Wuxi, China
21	2017	Hong Kong
22	2018	Bangkok, Thailand
23	2019	Chiba, Japan
24	2022	Seoul, South Korea
25	2023	Wuxi, China
26	2024	Kuwait City, Kuwait
27	2025	Bali, Indonesia
28	2026	New Delhi, India

== List of Asian Fencing Championship medalists ==
The tables below are medalists of individual and team events since 2004

=== Men's Individual Épée ===
Year	Host city	Gold	Silver	Bronze
2004	(Philippines) Manila	(South Korea) Kim Won-jin	(Kazakhstan) Sergey Shabalin	(Kazakhstan) Alexandr Axenov
2004	(Philippines) Manila	(South Korea) Kim Won-jin	(Kazakhstan) Sergey Shabalin	(Japan) Shogo Nishida
2005	(Malaysia) Kota Kinabalu	(Kazakhstan) Sergey Shabalin	(Hong Kong) Nicola Lu	(Kazakhstan) Alexandr Axenov
2005	(Malaysia) Kota Kinabalu	(Kazakhstan) Sergey Shabalin	(Hong Kong) Nicola Lu	(Japan) Keisuke Sakamoto
2007	(China) Nantong	(South Korea) Ju Hyun-seung	(Kazakhstan) Sergey Khodos	(China) Wang Lei
2007	(China) Nantong	(South Korea) Ju Hyun-seung	(Kazakhstan) Sergey Khodos	(Japan) Shogo Nishida
2008	(Thailand) Bangkok	(South Korea) Kim Won-jin	(Kazakhstan) Elmir Alimzhanov	(China) Li Guojie
2008	(Thailand) Bangkok	(South Korea) Kim Won-jin	(Kazakhstan) Elmir Alimzhanov	(Iran) Mohammad Rezaei
2009	(Qatar) Doha	(South Korea) Park Kyoung-doo	(South Korea) Jung Seung-hwa	(South Korea) An Sung-ho
2009	(Qatar) Doha	(South Korea) Park Kyoung-doo	(South Korea) Jung Seung-hwa	(China) Wang Feng
2010	(South Korea) Seoul	(South Korea) Kim Seung-gu	(Japan) Shogo Nishida	(South Korea) Kim Sang-min
2010	(South Korea) Seoul	(South Korea) Kim Seung-gu	(Japan) Shogo Nishida	(South Korea) Park Kyoung-doo
2011	(South Korea) Seoul	(South Korea) Jung Jin-sun	(Kazakhstan) Elmir Alimzhanov	(China) Li Guojie
2011	(South Korea) Seoul	(South Korea) Jung Jin-sun	(Kazakhstan) Elmir Alimzhanov	(South Korea) Park Kyoung-doo
2012	(Japan) Wakayama	(South Korea) Jung Jin-sun	(Kazakhstan) Elmir Alimzhanov	(China) Li Guojie
2012	(Japan) Wakayama	(South Korea) Jung Jin-sun	(Kazakhstan) Elmir Alimzhanov	(China) Zhang Chengjie
2013	(China) Shanghai	(Kazakhstan) Elmir Alimzhanov	(South Korea) Kweon Young-jun	(China) Li Guojie
2013	(China) Shanghai	(Kazakhstan) Elmir Alimzhanov	(South Korea) Kweon Young-jun	(South Korea) Kim Sang-min
2014	(South Korea) Suwon	(South Korea) Jung Jin-sun	(Japan) Keisuke Sakamoto	(South Korea) Park Kyoung-doo
2014	(South Korea) Suwon	(South Korea) Jung Jin-sun	(Japan) Keisuke Sakamoto	(Uzbekistan) Roman Aleksandrov
2015	Singapore	(China) Jiao Yunlong	(South Korea) Park Kyoung-doo	(Kazakhstan) Elmir Alimzhanov
2015	Singapore	(China) Jiao Yunlong	(South Korea) Park Kyoung-doo	(Japan) Kazuyasu Minobe
2016	(China) Wuxi	(South Korea) Park Kyoung-doo	(South Korea) Park Sang-young	(Japan) Kazuyasu Minobe
2016	(China) Wuxi	(South Korea) Park Kyoung-doo	(South Korea) Park Sang-young	(China) Shi Gaofeng
2017	Hong Kong	(Kazakhstan) Ruslan Kurbanov	(South Korea) Kweon Young-jun	(South Korea) Park Kyoung-doo
2017	Hong Kong	(Kazakhstan) Ruslan Kurbanov	(South Korea) Kweon Young-jun	(South Korea) Jung Jin-sun
2018	(Thailand) Bangkok	(South Korea) Jung Jin-sun	(Kazakhstan) Dmitriy Alexanin	(Hong Kong) Fong Hoi Sun
2018	(Thailand) Bangkok	(South Korea) Jung Jin-sun	(Kazakhstan) Dmitriy Alexanin	(Japan) Koki Kano
2019	(Japan) Chiba	(Japan) Masaru Yamada	(Japan) Satoru Uyama	(Vietnam) Nguyễn Tiến Nhật
2019	(Japan) Chiba	(Japan) Masaru Yamada	(Japan) Satoru Uyama	(Kazakhstan) Ruslan Kurbanov
2022	(South Korea) Seoul	(Japan) Koki Kano	(Japan) Akira Komata	(South Korea) Park Sang-young
2022	(South Korea) Seoul	(Japan) Koki Kano	(Japan) Akira Komata	(China) Lan Minghao
2023	(China) Wuxi	(Japan) Koki Kano	(China) Yu Lefan	(Japan) Akira Komata
2023	(China) Wuxi	(Japan) Koki Kano	(China) Yu Lefan	(South Korea) Kim Jae-won
2024	Kuwait City	(Hong Kong) Ho Wai Hang	(Hong Kong) Ng Ho Tin	(Japan) Akira Komata
2024	Kuwait City	(Hong Kong) Ho Wai Hang	(Hong Kong) Ng Ho Tin	(Kazakhstan) Yerlik Sertay
2025	(Indonesia) Bali	(China) Wang Zijie	(Japan) Masaru Yamada	(Kazakhstan) Vadim Sharlaimov
2025	(Indonesia) Bali	(China) Wang Zijie	(Japan) Masaru Yamada	(China) Zhang Xinkun
2026	(India) New Delhi	(Japan) Masaru Yamada	(Chinese Taipei) Lee Rang	(Kazakhstan) Ruslan Kurbanov
2026	(India) New Delhi	(Japan) Masaru Yamada	(Chinese Taipei) Lee Rang	(Japan) Koki Kano

=== Men's Team Épée ===
Year	Host city	Gold	Silver	Bronze
2004	(Philippines) Manila	Kazakhstan	Iran	China
2004	(Philippines) Manila	Kazakhstan	Iran	South Korea
2005	(Malaysia) Kota Kinabalu	Kazakhstan	Iran	Japan
2005	(Malaysia) Kota Kinabalu	Kazakhstan	Iran	South Korea
2007	(China) Nantong	China	Kazakhstan	Japan
2007	(China) Nantong	China	Kazakhstan	South Korea
2008	(Thailand) Bangkok	South Korea	Kazakhstan	China
2008	(Thailand) Bangkok	South Korea	Kazakhstan	Iran
2009	(Qatar) Doha	South Korea	Kazakhstan	China
2009	(Qatar) Doha	South Korea	Kazakhstan	Japan
2010	(South Korea) Seoul	South Korea	China	Kazakhstan
2010	(South Korea) Seoul	South Korea	China	Hong Kong
2011	(South Korea) Seoul	South Korea	China	Kyrgyzstan
2011	(South Korea) Seoul	South Korea	China	Kazakhstan
2012	(Japan) Wakayama	South Korea	Kazakhstan	China
2012	(Japan) Wakayama	South Korea	Kazakhstan	Japan
2013	(China) Shanghai	Kazakhstan	China	South Korea
2013	(China) Shanghai	Kazakhstan	China	Hong Kong
2014	(South Korea) Suwon	South Korea	China	Japan
2014	(South Korea) Suwon	South Korea	China	Kyrgyzstan
2015	Singapore	Kazakhstan	China	Japan
2015	Singapore	Kazakhstan	China	South Korea
2016	(China) Wuxi	Japan	South Korea	Kazakhstan
2016	(China) Wuxi	Japan	South Korea	China
2017	Hong Kong	South Korea	China	Japan
2017	Hong Kong	South Korea	China	Hong Kong
2018	(Thailand) Bangkok	China	Kazakhstan	Uzbekistan
2018	(Thailand) Bangkok	China	Kazakhstan	South Korea
2019	(Japan) Chiba	China	South Korea	Japan
2019	(Japan) Chiba	China	South Korea	Kazakhstan
2022	(South Korea) Seoul	South Korea	Uzbekistan	Japan
2022	(South Korea) Seoul	South Korea	Uzbekistan	China
2023	(China) Wuxi	Japan	Kazakhstan	South Korea
2023	(China) Wuxi	Japan	Kazakhstan	Hong Kong
2024	Kuwait City	Kazakhstan	Japan	China
2024	Kuwait City	Kazakhstan	Japan	Hong Kong
2025	(Indonesia) Bali	Japan	Kazakhstan	China
2025	(Indonesia) Bali	Japan	Kazakhstan	South Korea
2026	(India) New Delhi	Kazakhstan	Japan	Hong Kong
2026	(India) New Delhi	Kazakhstan	Japan	South Korea

=== Men's Individual Foil ===
Year	Host City	Gold	Silver	Bronze
2004	(Philippines) Manila	(China) Zhu Jun	(Thailand) Nontapat Panchan	(South Korea) Cha Hyung-woo
2004	(Philippines) Manila	(China) Zhu Jun	(Thailand) Nontapat Panchan	(Japan) Toru Yamaguchi
2005	(Malaysia) Kota Kinabalu	(China) Zhu Jun	(Japan) Daisuke Saito	(South Korea) Lee Kwan-haeng
2005	(Malaysia) Kota Kinabalu	(China) Zhu Jun	(Japan) Daisuke Saito	(Iran) Javad Rezaei
2007	(China) Nantong	(Japan) Yuki Ota	(China) Huang Liangcai	(Japan) Yusuke Fukuda
2007	(China) Nantong	(Japan) Yuki Ota	(China) Huang Liangcai	(China) Zhang Liangliang
2008	(Thailand) Bangkok	(Japan) Yuki Ota	(China) Zhu Jun	(China) Lei Sheng
2008	(Thailand) Bangkok	(Japan) Yuki Ota	(China) Zhu Jun	(China) Zhang Liangliang
2009	(Qatar) Doha	(Japan) Yuki Ota	(China) Zhu Jun	(South Korea) Kwon Young-ho
2009	(Qatar) Doha	(Japan) Yuki Ota	(China) Zhu Jun	(South Korea) Ha Tae-gyu
2010	(South Korea) Seoul	(China) Huang Liangcai	(China) Lei Sheng	(Japan) Ryo Miyake
2010	(South Korea) Seoul	(China) Huang Liangcai	(China) Lei Sheng	(China) Zhu Jun
2011	(South Korea) Seoul	(South Korea) Kwon Young-ho	(Japan) Kenta Chida	(China) Huang Liangcai
2011	(South Korea) Seoul	(South Korea) Kwon Young-ho	(Japan) Kenta Chida	(China) Zhu Jun
2012	(Japan) Wakayama	(China) Lei Sheng	(China) Huang Liangcai	(Japan) Ryo Miyake
2012	(Japan) Wakayama	(China) Lei Sheng	(China) Huang Liangcai	(Japan) Yuki Ota
2013	(China) Shanghai	(South Korea) Heo Jun	(Japan) Ryo Miyake	(Hong Kong) Cheung Siu Lun
2013	(China) Shanghai	(South Korea) Heo Jun	(Japan) Ryo Miyake	(South Korea) Kim Min-kyu
2014	(South Korea) Suwon	(South Korea) Heo Jun	(China) Chen Haiwei	(China) Li Chen
2014	(South Korea) Suwon	(South Korea) Heo Jun	(China) Chen Haiwei	(Japan) Kenta Chida
2015	Singapore	(Japan) Yuki Ota	(South Korea) Son Young-ki	(Hong Kong) Cheung Ka Long
2015	Singapore	(Japan) Yuki Ota	(South Korea) Son Young-ki	(South Korea) Kwon Young-ho
2016	(China) Wuxi	(Hong Kong) Cheung Ka Long	(Japan) Takahiro Shikine	(China) Lei Sheng
2016	(China) Wuxi	(Hong Kong) Cheung Ka Long	(Japan) Takahiro Shikine	(South Korea) Kwon Young-ho
2017	Hong Kong	(South Korea) Ha Tae-gyu	(Hong Kong) Cheung Ka Long	(China) Chen Haiwei
2017	Hong Kong	(South Korea) Ha Tae-gyu	(Hong Kong) Cheung Ka Long	(South Korea) Son Young-ki
2018	(Thailand) Bangkok	(Hong Kong) Cheung Siu Lun	(South Korea) Heo Jun	(China) Huang Mengkai
2018	(Thailand) Bangkok	(Hong Kong) Cheung Siu Lun	(South Korea) Heo Jun	(South Korea) Ha Tae-gyu
2019	(Japan) Chiba	(Japan) Takahiro Shikine	(Hong Kong) Cheung Ka Long	(China) Chen Haiwei
2019	(Japan) Chiba	(Japan) Takahiro Shikine	(Hong Kong) Cheung Ka Long	(Japan) Toshiya Saito
2022	(South Korea) Seoul	(Hong Kong) Cheung Ka Long	(China) Mo Ziwei	(China) Wu Bin
2022	(South Korea) Seoul	(Hong Kong) Cheung Ka Long	(China) Mo Ziwei	(Hong Kong) Ryan Choi
2023	(China) Wuxi	(China) Mo Ziwei	(South Korea) Ha Tae-gyu	(Hong Kong) Yeung Chi Ka
2023	(China) Wuxi	(China) Mo Ziwei	(South Korea) Ha Tae-gyu	(South Korea) Heo Jun
2024	Kuwait City	(Japan) Kyosuke Matsuyama	(Japan) Kazuki Iimura	(China) Mo Ziwei
2024	Kuwait City	(Japan) Kyosuke Matsuyama	(Japan) Kazuki Iimura	(Japan) Takahiro Shikine
2025	(Indonesia) Bali	(Hong Kong) Ryan Choi	(China) Mo Ziwei	(South Korea) Youn Jeong-hyun
2025	(Indonesia) Bali	(Hong Kong) Ryan Choi	(China) Mo Ziwei	(China) Xu Jie
2026	(India) New Delhi	(Japan) Kyosuke Matsuyama	(Japan) Kazuki Iimura	(South Korea) Youn Jeong-hyun
2026	(India) New Delhi	(Japan) Kyosuke Matsuyama	(Japan) Kazuki Iimura	(South Korea) Im Cheol-woo

=== Men's Team Foil ===
Year	Host city	Gold	Silver	Bronze
2004	(Philippines) Manila	China	Japan	Hong Kong
2004	(Philippines) Manila	China	Japan	South Korea
2005	(Malaysia) Kota Kinabalu	China	Japan	South Korea
2005	(Malaysia) Kota Kinabalu	China	Japan	Uzbekistan
2007	(China) Nantong	China	Japan	South Korea
2007	(China) Nantong	China	Japan	Hong Kong
2008	(Thailand) Bangkok	China	Japan	South Korea
2008	(Thailand) Bangkok	China	Japan	Hong Kong
2009	(Qatar) Doha	Japan	China	South Korea
2009	(Qatar) Doha	Japan	China	Hong Kong
2010	(South Korea) Seoul	China	Japan	South Korea
2010	(South Korea) Seoul	China	Japan	Hong Kong
2011	(South Korea) Seoul	China	Japan	South Korea
2011	(South Korea) Seoul	China	Japan	Hong Kong
2012	(Japan) Wakayama	South Korea	China	Japan
2012	(Japan) Wakayama	South Korea	China	Hong Kong
2013	(China) Shanghai	South Korea	Japan	China
2013	(China) Shanghai	South Korea	Japan	Hong Kong
2014	(South Korea) Suwon	China	South Korea	Japan
2014	(South Korea) Suwon	China	South Korea	Hong Kong
2015	Singapore	China	South Korea	Japan
2015	Singapore	China	South Korea	Hong Kong
2016	(China) Wuxi	South Korea	China	Japan
2016	(China) Wuxi	South Korea	China	Hong Kong
2017	Hong Kong	China	South Korea	Hong Kong
2017	Hong Kong	China	South Korea	Japan
2018	(Thailand) Bangkok	South Korea	Hong Kong	Japan
2018	(Thailand) Bangkok	South Korea	Hong Kong	Australia
2019	(Japan) Chiba	Japan	China	Hong Kong
2019	(Japan) Chiba	Japan	China	South Korea
2022	(South Korea) Seoul	Japan	South Korea	Hong Kong
2022	(South Korea) Seoul	Japan	South Korea	Chinese Taipei
2023	(China) Wuxi	Japan	South Korea	China
2023	(China) Wuxi	Japan	South Korea	Hong Kong
2024	Kuwait City	China	South Korea	Japan
2024	Kuwait City	China	South Korea	Hong Kong
2025	(Indonesia) Bali	Japan	China	Hong Kong
2025	(Indonesia) Bali	Japan	China	Chinese Taipei
2026	(India) New Delhi	Japan	Hong Kong	China
2026	(India) New Delhi	Japan	Hong Kong	South Korea

=== Men's Individual Sabre ===
Year	Host City	Gold	Silver	Bronze
2004	(Philippines) Manila	(China) Zhong Man	(China) Cai Lin	(Iran) Mojtaba Abedini
2004	(Philippines) Manila	(China) Zhong Man	(China) Cai Lin	(Iran) Peyman Fakhri
2005	(Malaysia) Kota Kinabalu	(China) Zhou Hanming	(South Korea) Hwang Byung-yul	(Iran) Mojtaba Abedini
2005	(Malaysia) Kota Kinabalu	(China) Zhou Hanming	(South Korea) Hwang Byung-yul	(Kazakhstan) Igor Tsel
2007	(China) Nantong	(China) Wang Jingzhi	(China) Zhong Man	(China) Zhou Hanming
2007	(China) Nantong	(China) Wang Jingzhi	(China) Zhong Man	(South Korea) Kim Jung-hwan
2008	(Thailand) Bangkok	(China) Zhong Man	(China) Zhou Hanming	(Thailand) Wiradech Kothny
2008	(Thailand) Bangkok	(China) Zhong Man	(China) Zhou Hanming	(South Korea) Oh Eun-seok
2009	(Qatar) Doha	(South Korea) Kim Jung-hwan	(South Korea) Oh Eun-seok	(China) Zhong Man
2009	(Qatar) Doha	(South Korea) Kim Jung-hwan	(South Korea) Oh Eun-seok	(Japan) Koji Yamamoto
2010	(South Korea) Seoul	(South Korea) Gu Bon-gil	(South Korea) Oh Eun-seok	(China) Jiang Kelü
2010	(South Korea) Seoul	(South Korea) Gu Bon-gil	(South Korea) Oh Eun-seok	(China) Wang Jingzhi
2011	(South Korea) Seoul	(South Korea) Won Woo-young	(South Korea) Gu Bon-gil	(China) Liu Xiao
2011	(South Korea) Seoul	(South Korea) Won Woo-young	(South Korea) Gu Bon-gil	(South Korea) Oh Eun-seok
2012	(Japan) Wakayama	(South Korea) Gu Bon-gil	(South Korea) Won Woo-young	(China) Zhong Man
2012	(Japan) Wakayama	(South Korea) Gu Bon-gil	(South Korea) Won Woo-young	(South Korea) Kim Jung-hwan
2013	(China) Shanghai	(South Korea) Gu Bon-gil	(South Korea) Kim Jung-hwan	(Iran) Mojtaba Abedini
2013	(China) Shanghai	(South Korea) Gu Bon-gil	(South Korea) Kim Jung-hwan	(South Korea) Oh Eun-seok
2014	(South Korea) Suwon	(South Korea) Gu Bon-gil	(Iran) Mojtaba Abedini	(Iran) Ali Pakdaman
2014	(South Korea) Suwon	(South Korea) Gu Bon-gil	(Iran) Mojtaba Abedini	(Hong Kong) Lam Hin Chung
2015	Singapore	(South Korea) Kim Jung-hwan	(South Korea) Gu Bon-gil	(Iran) Mojtaba Abedini
2015	Singapore	(South Korea) Kim Jung-hwan	(South Korea) Gu Bon-gil	(South Korea) Won Woo-young
2016	(China) Wuxi	(South Korea) Kim Jung-hwan	(Iran) Ali Pakdaman	(Vietnam) Vũ Thành An
2016	(China) Wuxi	(South Korea) Kim Jung-hwan	(Iran) Ali Pakdaman	(China) Xu Yingming
2017	Hong Kong	(South Korea) Gu Bon-gil	(Iran) Mohammad Rahbari	(Iran) Ali Pakdaman
2017	Hong Kong	(South Korea) Gu Bon-gil	(Iran) Mohammad Rahbari	(South Korea) Kim Jun-ho
2018	(Thailand) Bangkok	(South Korea) Gu Bon-gil	(South Korea) Kim Jung-hwan	(Iran) Ali Pakdaman
2018	(Thailand) Bangkok	(South Korea) Gu Bon-gil	(South Korea) Kim Jung-hwan	(South Korea) Kim Jun-ho
2019	(Japan) Chiba	(South Korea) Oh Sang-uk	(China) Wang Shi	(Iran) Mojtaba Abedini
2019	(Japan) Chiba	(South Korea) Oh Sang-uk	(China) Wang Shi	(South Korea) Ha Han-sol
2022	(South Korea) Seoul	(South Korea) Gu Bon-gil	(South Korea) Kim Jung-hwan	(South Korea) Oh Sang-uk
2022	(South Korea) Seoul	(South Korea) Gu Bon-gil	(South Korea) Kim Jung-hwan	(Kazakhstan) Artyom Sarkissyan
2023	(China) Wuxi	(Iran) Ali Pakdaman	(South Korea) Kim Jun-ho	(Iran) Mohammad Rahbari
2023	(China) Wuxi	(Iran) Ali Pakdaman	(South Korea) Kim Jun-ho	(Hong Kong) Low Ho Tin
2024	Kuwait City	(South Korea) Oh Sang-uk	(China) Shen Chenpeng	(Japan) Kaito Streets
2024	Kuwait City	(South Korea) Oh Sang-uk	(China) Shen Chenpeng	(Japan) Mao Kokubo
2025	(Indonesia) Bali	(South Korea) Do Gyeong-dong	(China) Shen Chenpeng	(Kuwait) Yousef Alshamlan
2025	(Indonesia) Bali	(South Korea) Do Gyeong-dong	(China) Shen Chenpeng	(Iran) Mohammad Rahbari
2026	(India) New Delhi	(South Korea) Oh Sang-uk	(China) Luo Shaotong	(South Korea) Do Gyeong-dong
2026	(India) New Delhi	(South Korea) Oh Sang-uk	(China) Luo Shaotong	(Japan) Tsumori Shido

=== Men's Team Sabre ===
Year	Host city	Gold	Silver	Bronze
2004	(Philippines) Manila	China	South Korea	Iran
2004	(Philippines) Manila	China	South Korea	Kazakhstan
2005	(Malaysia) Kota Kinabalu	South Korea	China	Hong Kong
2005	(Malaysia) Kota Kinabalu	South Korea	China	Iran
2007	(China) Nantong	China	South Korea	Japan
2007	(China) Nantong	China	South Korea	Iran
2008	(Thailand) Bangkok	China	South Korea	Iran
2008	(Thailand) Bangkok	China	South Korea	Hong Kong
2009	(Qatar) Doha	China	Japan	South Korea
2009	(Qatar) Doha	China	Japan	Kazakhstan
2010	(South Korea) Seoul	China	South Korea	Iran
2010	(South Korea) Seoul	China	South Korea	Japan
2011	(South Korea) Seoul	South Korea	China	Hong Kong
2011	(South Korea) Seoul	South Korea	China	Kazakhstan
2012	(Japan) Wakayama	China	South Korea	Iran
2012	(Japan) Wakayama	China	South Korea	Hong Kong
2013	(China) Shanghai	South Korea	Iran	Kazakhstan
2013	(China) Shanghai	South Korea	Iran	Japan
2014	(South Korea) Suwon	South Korea	Japan	China
2014	(South Korea) Suwon	South Korea	Japan	Iran
2015	Singapore	South Korea	Iran	China
2015	Singapore	South Korea	Iran	Kazakhstan
2016	(China) Wuxi	South Korea	China	Vietnam
2016	(China) Wuxi	South Korea	China	Hong Kong
2017	Hong Kong	South Korea	Iran	China
2017	Hong Kong	South Korea	Iran	Hong Kong
2018	(Thailand) Bangkok	China	Iran	South Korea
2018	(Thailand) Bangkok	China	Iran	Japan
2019	(Japan) Chiba	South Korea	Iran	Japan
2019	(Japan) Chiba	South Korea	Iran	China
2022	(South Korea) Seoul	South Korea	Japan	Iran
2022	(South Korea) Seoul	South Korea	Japan	Hong Kong
2023	(China) Wuxi	South Korea	Iran	China
2023	(China) Wuxi	South Korea	Iran	Japan
2024	Kuwait City	South Korea	Iran	Hong Kong
2024	Kuwait City	South Korea	Iran	Kazakhstan
2025	(Indonesia) Bali	Japan	South Korea	Uzbekistan
2025	(Indonesia) Bali	Japan	South Korea	Hong Kong
2026	(India) New Delhi	South Korea	Japan	Kazakhstan
2026	(India) New Delhi	South Korea	Japan	China

=== Women's Individual Épée ===
Year	Host City	Gold	Silver	Bronze
2004	(Philippines) Manila	(China) Tan Li	(Japan) Megumi Harada	(Hong Kong) Sabrina Lui
2004	(Philippines) Manila	(China) Tan Li	(Japan) Megumi Harada	(China) Zhang Jiangqing
2005	(Malaysia) Kota Kinabalu	(China) Luo Xiaojuan	(China) Qin Lanlan	(South Korea) Kim Ju-ha
2005	(Malaysia) Kota Kinabalu	(China) Luo Xiaojuan	(China) Qin Lanlan	(China) Shen Weiwei
2007	(China) Nantong	(China) Li Na	(Australia) Amber Parkinson	(China) Luo Xiaojuan
2007	(China) Nantong	(China) Li Na	(Australia) Amber Parkinson	(China) Zhang Li
2008	(Thailand) Bangkok	(China) Li Na	(China) Luo Xiaojuan	(Australia) Amber Parkinson
2008	(Thailand) Bangkok	(China) Li Na	(China) Luo Xiaojuan	(China) Zhang Li
2009	(Qatar) Doha	(China) Luo Xiaojuan	(China) Xu Anqi	(South Korea) Jung Hyo-jung
2009	(Qatar) Doha	(China) Luo Xiaojuan	(China) Xu Anqi	(South Korea) Oh Yun-hee
2010	(South Korea) Seoul	(South Korea) Jung Hyo-jung	(China) Luo Xiaojuan	(China) Yin Mingfang
2010	(South Korea) Seoul	(South Korea) Jung Hyo-jung	(China) Luo Xiaojuan	(South Korea) Oh Yun-hee
2011	(South Korea) Seoul	(South Korea) Choi In-jeong	(China) Luo Xiaojuan	(China) Yin Mingfang
2011	(South Korea) Seoul	(South Korea) Choi In-jeong	(China) Luo Xiaojuan	(South Korea) Shin A-lam
2012	(Japan) Wakayama	(South Korea) Shin A-lam	(China) Sun Yujie	(China) Xu Anqi
2012	(Japan) Wakayama	(South Korea) Shin A-lam	(China) Sun Yujie	(South Korea) Choi In-jeong
2013	(China) Shanghai	(China) Xu Anqi	(Australia) Jo Halls	(China) Ayaka Shimookawa
2013	(China) Shanghai	(China) Xu Anqi	(Australia) Jo Halls	(Hong Kong) Yeung Chui Ling
2014	(South Korea) Suwon	(South Korea) Choi In-jeong	(South Korea) Shin A-lam	(Japan) Ayaka Shimookawa
2014	(South Korea) Suwon	(South Korea) Choi In-jeong	(South Korea) Shin A-lam	(China) Qin Xue
2015	Singapore	(China) Xu Anqi	(South Korea) Choi In-jeong	(Japan) Ayaka Shimookawa
2015	Singapore	(China) Xu Anqi	(South Korea) Choi In-jeong	(Japan) Nozomi Sato
2016	(China) Wuxi	(China) Sun Yujie	(China) Xu Anqi	(South Korea) Kang Young-mi
2016	(China) Wuxi	(China) Sun Yujie	(China) Xu Anqi	(South Korea) Shin A-lam
2017	Hong Kong	(South Korea) Kang Young-mi	(Hong Kong) Vivian Kong	(China) Sun Yiwen
2017	Hong Kong	(South Korea) Kang Young-mi	(Hong Kong) Vivian Kong	(China) Zhu Mingye
2018	(Thailand) Bangkok	(Hong Kong) Vivian Kong	(South Korea) Kang Young-mi	(Hong Kong) Kaylin Hsieh
2018	(Thailand) Bangkok	(Hong Kong) Vivian Kong	(South Korea) Kang Young-mi	(South Korea) Lee Hye-in
2019	(Japan) Chiba	(China) Zhu Mingye	(China) Lin Sheng	(South Korea) Choi In-jeong
2019	(Japan) Chiba	(China) Zhu Mingye	(China) Lin Sheng	(South Korea) Kang Young-mi
2022	(South Korea) Seoul	(Hong Kong) Vivian Kong	(South Korea) Choi In-jeong	(Hong Kong) Chan Wai Ling
2022	(South Korea) Seoul	(Hong Kong) Vivian Kong	(South Korea) Choi In-jeong	(Japan) Nozomi Sato
2023	(China) Wuxi	(Hong Kong) Vivian Kong	(South Korea) Song Se-ra	(China) Lin Sheng
2023	(China) Wuxi	(Hong Kong) Vivian Kong	(South Korea) Song Se-ra	(South Korea) Choi In-jeong
2024	Kuwait City	(China) Yu Sihan	(China) Sun Yiwen	(South Korea) Kang Young-mi
2024	Kuwait City	(China) Yu Sihan	(China) Sun Yiwen	(South Korea) Song Se-ra
2025	(Indonesia) Bali	(South Korea) Song Se-ra	(China) YANG Jingwen	(Hong Kong) Kaylin Hsieh
2025	(Indonesia) Bali	(South Korea) Song Se-ra	(China) YANG Jingwen	(Singapore) Kiria Tikanah
2026	(India) New Delhi	(Kazakhstan) Irina Bakaldina	(Hong Kong) Kaylin Hsieh	(Japan) Tamaki Terayama
2026	(India) New Delhi	(Kazakhstan) Irina Bakaldina	(Hong Kong) Kaylin Hsieh	(South Korea) Song Se-ra

=== Women's Team Épée ===
Year	Host city	Gold	Silver	Bronze
2004	(Philippines) Manila	China	South Korea	Hong Kong
2004	(Philippines) Manila	China	South Korea	Kazakhstan
2005	(Malaysia) Kota Kinabalu	China	South Korea	Hong Kong
2005	(Malaysia) Kota Kinabalu	China	South Korea	Japan
2007	(China) Nantong	China	South Korea	Japan
2007	(China) Nantong	China	South Korea	Hong Kong
2008	(Thailand) Bangkok	China	Japan	Hong Kong
2008	(Thailand) Bangkok	China	Japan	South Korea
2009	(Qatar) Doha	South Korea	China	Hong Kong
2009	(Qatar) Doha	South Korea	China	Japan
2010	(South Korea) Seoul	China	South Korea	Hong Kong
2010	(South Korea) Seoul	China	South Korea	Chinese Taipei
2011	(South Korea) Seoul	China	South Korea	Japan
2011	(South Korea) Seoul	China	South Korea	Hong Kong
2012	(Japan) Wakayama	China	South Korea	Japan
2012	(Japan) Wakayama	China	South Korea	Hong Kong
2013	(China) Shanghai	China	South Korea	Hong Kong
2013	(China) Shanghai	China	South Korea	Kazakhstan
2014	(South Korea) Suwon	China	South Korea	Hong Kong
2014	(South Korea) Suwon	China	South Korea	Japan
2015	Singapore	South Korea	China	Japan
2015	Singapore	South Korea	China	Hong Kong
2016	(China) Wuxi	South Korea	China	Hong Kong
2016	(China) Wuxi	South Korea	China	Japan
2017	Hong Kong	China	South Korea	Japan
2017	Hong Kong	China	South Korea	Hong Kong
2018	(Thailand) Bangkok	China	Hong Kong	South Korea
2018	(Thailand) Bangkok	China	Hong Kong	Japan
2019	(Japan) Chiba	South Korea	China	Hong Kong
2019	(Japan) Chiba	South Korea	China	Japan
2022	(South Korea) Seoul	South Korea	Hong Kong	Japan
2022	(South Korea) Seoul	South Korea	Hong Kong	China
2023	(China) Wuxi	South Korea	Hong Kong	China
2023	(China) Wuxi	South Korea	Hong Kong	Japan
2024	Kuwait City	South Korea	China	Hong Kong
2024	Kuwait City	South Korea	China	Japan
2025	(Indonesia) Bali	China	South Korea	Hong Kong
2025	(Indonesia) Bali	China	South Korea	Japan
2026	(India) New Delhi	South Korea	China	Kazakhstan
2026	(India) New Delhi	South Korea	China	Singapore

=== Women's Individual Foil ===
Year	Host City	Gold	Silver	Bronze
2004	(Philippines) Manila	(China) Su Wanwen	(China) Ma Na	(South Korea) Kim Na-rae
2004	(Philippines) Manila	(China) Su Wanwen	(China) Ma Na	(China) Liu Yuan
2005	(Malaysia) Kota Kinabalu	(South Korea) Chang Mi-kyung	(China) Zhang Lei	(Japan) Kaori Zanma
2005	(Malaysia) Kota Kinabalu	(South Korea) Chang Mi-kyung	(China) Zhang Lei	(China) Qui Yilin
2007	(China) Nantong	(China) Zhang Lei	(China) Su Wanwen	(Japan) Chieko Sugawara
2007	(China) Nantong	(China) Zhang Lei	(China) Su Wanwen	(South Korea) Jung Gil-ok
2008	(Thailand) Bangkok	(Japan) Chieko Sugawara	(China) Sun Chao	(China) Su Wanwen
2008	(Thailand) Bangkok	(Japan) Chieko Sugawara	(China) Sun Chao	(China) Huang Jialing
2009	(Qatar) Doha	(South Korea) Nam Hyun-hee	(China) Dai Huili	(South Korea) Jeon Hee-sook
2009	(Qatar) Doha	(South Korea) Nam Hyun-hee	(China) Dai Huili	(Japan) Yuki Mori
2010	(South Korea) Seoul	(South Korea) Nam Hyun-hee	(South Korea) Jeon Hee-sook	(South Korea) Oh Ha-na
2010	(South Korea) Seoul	(South Korea) Nam Hyun-hee	(South Korea) Jeon Hee-sook	(Japan) Kanae Ikehata
2011	(South Korea) Seoul	(South Korea) Nam Hyun-hee	(South Korea) Jung Gil-ok	(China) Liu Yongshi
2011	(South Korea) Seoul	(South Korea) Nam Hyun-hee	(South Korea) Jung Gil-ok	(China) Le Huilin
2012	(Japan) Wakayama	(South Korea) Nam Hyun-hee	(South Korea) Jung Gil-ok	(China) Chen Jinyan
2012	(Japan) Wakayama	(South Korea) Nam Hyun-hee	(South Korea) Jung Gil-ok	(South Korea) Oh Ha-na
2013	(China) Shanghai	(South Korea) Jeon Hee-sook	(China) Liu Yongshi	(South Korea) Kim Mi-na
2013	(China) Shanghai	(South Korea) Jeon Hee-sook	(China) Liu Yongshi	(South Korea) Jung Gil-ok
2014	Singapore	(South Korea) Nam Hyun-hee	(South Korea) Jeon Hee-sook	(South Korea) Kim Mi-na
2014	Singapore	(South Korea) Nam Hyun-hee	(South Korea) Jeon Hee-sook	(China) Le Huilin
2015	(South Korea) Suwon	(South Korea) Jeon Hee-sook	(South Korea) Nam Hyun-hee	(China) Chen Bingbing
2015	(South Korea) Suwon	(South Korea) Jeon Hee-sook	(South Korea) Nam Hyun-hee	(China) Le Huilin
2016	(China) Wuxi	(South Korea) Nam Hyun-hee	(China) Le Huilin	(South Korea) Kim Mi-na
2016	(China) Wuxi	(South Korea) Nam Hyun-hee	(China) Le Huilin	(Japan) Minami Kano
2017	Hong Kong	(China) Huo Xingxin	(South Korea) Nam Hyun-hee	(South Korea) Jeon Hee-sook
2017	Hong Kong	(China) Huo Xingxin	(South Korea) Nam Hyun-hee	(Japan) Minami Kano
2018	(Thailand) Bangkok	(Japan) Komaki Kikuchi	(South Korea) Jeon Hee-sook	(South Korea) Nam Hyun-hee
2018	(Thailand) Bangkok	(Japan) Komaki Kikuchi	(South Korea) Jeon Hee-sook	(China) Fu Yiting
2019	(Japan) Chiba	(South Korea) Jeon Hee-sook	(Japan) Yuka Ueno	(China) Chen Qingyuan
2019	(Japan) Chiba	(South Korea) Jeon Hee-sook	(Japan) Yuka Ueno	(Japan) Sera Azuma
2022	(South Korea) Seoul	(China) Shi Yue	(China) Chen Qingyuan	(Japan) Yuka Ueno
2022	(South Korea) Seoul	(China) Shi Yue	(China) Chen Qingyuan	(Japan) Sera Azuma
2023	(China) Wuxi	(China) Chen Qingyuan	(Japan) Sera Azuma	(China) Shi Yue
2023	(China) Wuxi	(China) Chen Qingyuan	(Japan) Sera Azuma	(Singapore) Amita Berthier
2024	Kuwait City	(South Korea) Hong Se-na	(Japan) Komaki Kikuchi	(Japan) Yuka Ueno
2024	Kuwait City	(South Korea) Hong Se-na	(Japan) Komaki Kikuchi	(China) Wang Yuting
2025	(Indonesia) Bali	(Japan) Yuka Ueno	(Japan) Sumire Tsuji	(Japan) Komaki Kikuchi
2025	(Indonesia) Bali	(Japan) Yuka Ueno	(Japan) Sumire Tsuji	(China) Jiao Enqi
2026	(India) New Delhi	(Japan) Yuka Ueno	(Japan) Sera Azuma	(Japan) Komaki Kikuchi
2026	(India) New Delhi	(Japan) Yuka Ueno	(Japan) Sera Azuma	(Hong Kong) Daphne Chan

=== Women's Team Foil ===
Year	Host city	Gold	Silver	Bronze
2004	(Philippines) Manila	China	South Korea	Hong Kong
2004	(Philippines) Manila	China	South Korea	Japan
2005	(Malaysia) Kota Kinabalu	China	Japan	Kazakhstan
2005	(Malaysia) Kota Kinabalu	China	Japan	South Korea
2007	(China) Nantong	China	South Korea	Japan
2007	(China) Nantong	China	South Korea	Singapore
2008	(Thailand) Bangkok	China	Japan	Kazakhstan
2008	(Thailand) Bangkok	China	Japan	Hong Kong
2009	(Qatar) Doha	South Korea	China	Japan
2009	(Qatar) Doha	South Korea	China	Hong Kong
2010	(South Korea) Seoul	South Korea	Japan	China
2010	(South Korea) Seoul	South Korea	Japan	Singapore
2011	(South Korea) Seoul	South Korea	Japan	China
2011	(South Korea) Seoul	South Korea	Japan	Hong Kong
2012	(Japan) Wakayama	China	South Korea	Japan
2012	(Japan) Wakayama	China	South Korea	Vietnam
2013	(China) Shanghai	South Korea	China	Japan
2013	(China) Shanghai	South Korea	China	Hong Kong
2014	(South Korea) Suwon	South Korea	China	Japan
2014	(South Korea) Suwon	South Korea	China	Hong Kong
2015	Singapore	South Korea	China	Hong Kong
2015	Singapore	South Korea	China	Japan
2016	(China) Wuxi	China	South Korea	Japan
2016	(China) Wuxi	China	South Korea	Hong Kong
2017	Hong Kong	South Korea	Japan	China
2017	Hong Kong	South Korea	Japan	Hong Kong
2018	(Thailand) Bangkok	South Korea	Japan	China
2018	(Thailand) Bangkok	South Korea	Japan	Hong Kong
2019	(Japan) Chiba	Japan	South Korea	China
2019	(Japan) Chiba	Japan	South Korea	Hong Kong
2022	(South Korea) Seoul	Japan	China	South Korea
2022	(South Korea) Seoul	Japan	China	Singapore
2023	(China) Wuxi	Japan	China	Hong Kong
2023	(China) Wuxi	Japan	China	Singapore
2024	Kuwait City	Japan	China	South Korea
2024	Kuwait City	Japan	China	Hong Kong
2025	(Indonesia) Bali	Japan	China	Hong Kong
2025	(Indonesia) Bali	Japan	China	Singapore
2026	(India) New Delhi	Japan	China	South Korea
2026	(India) New Delhi	Japan	China	Hong Kong

=== Women's Team Sabre ===
Year	Host City	Gold	Silver	Bronze
2004	(Philippines) Manila	(China) Zhao Yuanyuan	(South Korea) Kim Young-ju	(Japan) Madoka Hisagae
2004	(Philippines) Manila	(China) Zhao Yuanyuan	(South Korea) Kim Young-ju	(Japan) Sakura Kaneko
2005	(Malaysia) Kota Kinabalu	(China) Zhao Yuanyuan	(China) Bao Yingying	(China) Huang Haiyang
2005	(Malaysia) Kota Kinabalu	(China) Zhao Yuanyuan	(China) Bao Yingying	(China) Zhao Xue
2007	(China) Nantong	(China) Tan Xue	(China) Bao Yingying	(South Korea) Kim Keum-hwa
2007	(China) Nantong	(China) Tan Xue	(China) Bao Yingying	(Japan) Seira Nakayama
2008	(Thailand) Bangkok	(China) Tan Xue	(China) Huang Haiyang	(South Korea) Lee Shin-mi
2008	(Thailand) Bangkok	(China) Tan Xue	(China) Huang Haiyang	(Japan) Madoka Hisagae
2009	(Qatar) Doha	(China) Ni Hong	(Hong Kong) Chow Tsz Ki	(China) Zhu Min
2009	(Qatar) Doha	(China) Ni Hong	(Hong Kong) Chow Tsz Ki	(South Korea) Kim Keum-hwa
2010	(South Korea) Seoul	(China) Tan Xue	(China) Zhu Min	(South Korea) Kim Keum-hwa
2010	(South Korea) Seoul	(China) Tan Xue	(China) Zhu Min	(South Korea) Mo Hyo-jung
2011	(South Korea) Seoul	(China) Chen Xiaodong	(South Korea) Lee Ra-jin	(China) Zhu Min
2011	(South Korea) Seoul	(China) Chen Xiaodong	(South Korea) Lee Ra-jin	(South Korea) Kim Keum-hwa
2012	(Japan) Wakayama	(South Korea) Yoon Ji-su	(China) Zhu Min	(South Korea) Lee Ra-jin
2012	(Japan) Wakayama	(South Korea) Yoon Ji-su	(China) Zhu Min	(Kazakhstan) Tamara Pochekutova
2013	(China) Shanghai	(South Korea) Kim Ji-yeon	(South Korea) Lee Ra-jin	(China) Zhu Min
2013	(China) Shanghai	(South Korea) Kim Ji-yeon	(South Korea) Lee Ra-jin	(China) Shen Chen
2014	(South Korea) Suwon	(South Korea) Kim Ji-yeon	(Japan) Misaki Emura	(South Korea) Lee Ra-jin
2014	(South Korea) Suwon	(South Korea) Kim Ji-yeon	(Japan) Misaki Emura	(China) Shen Chen
2015	Singapore	(China) Shen Chen	(Japan) Chika Aoki	(South Korea) Kim Ji-yeon
2015	Singapore	(China) Shen Chen	(Japan) Chika Aoki	(Japan) Misaki Emura
2016	(China) Wuxi	(South Korea) Hwang Seon-a	(China) Shao Yaqi	(South Korea) Kim Ji-yeon
2016	(China) Wuxi	(South Korea) Hwang Seon-a	(China) Shao Yaqi	(South Korea) Yoon Ji-su
2017	Hong Kong	(South Korea) Kim Ji-yeon	(South Korea) Seo Ji-yeon	(China) Yu Xinting
2017	Hong Kong	(South Korea) Kim Ji-yeon	(South Korea) Seo Ji-yeon	(Japan) Misaki Emura
2018	(Thailand) Bangkok	(South Korea) Kim Ji-yeon	(China) Qian Jiarui	(China) Lam Hin Wai
2018	(Thailand) Bangkok	(South Korea) Kim Ji-yeon	(China) Qian Jiarui	(South Korea) Choi Soo-yeon
2019	(Japan) Chiba	(South Korea) Yoon Ji-su	(Japan) Norika Tamura	(South Korea) Kim Ji-yeon
2019	(Japan) Chiba	(South Korea) Yoon Ji-su	(Japan) Norika Tamura	(Japan) Shihomi Fukushima
2022	(South Korea) Seoul	(South Korea) Choi Soo-yeon	(Japan) Misaki Emura	(China) Yang Hengyu
2022	(South Korea) Seoul	(South Korea) Choi Soo-yeon	(Japan) Misaki Emura	(China) Fu Ying
2023	(China) Wuxi	(Uzbekistan) Zaynab Dayibekova	(South Korea) Yoon Ji-su	(China) Yang Hengyu
2023	(China) Wuxi	(Uzbekistan) Zaynab Dayibekova	(South Korea) Yoon Ji-su	(India) Bhavani Devi
2024	Kuwait City	(Japan) Misaki Emura	(South Korea) Yoon Ji-su	(Japan) Seri Ozaki
2024	Kuwait City	(Japan) Misaki Emura	(South Korea) Yoon Ji-su	(South Korea) Jeon Ha-young
2025	(Indonesia) Bali	(Japan) Misaki Emura	(Singapore) Juliet Heng Jie Min	(South Korea) Kim Jeong-mi
2025	(Indonesia) Bali	(Japan) Misaki Emura	(Singapore) Juliet Heng Jie Min	(Uzbekistan) Luisa Fernanda Herrera Lara

=== Women's Team Sabre ===
Year	Host city	Gold	Silver	Bronze
2004	(Philippines) Manila	China	Japan	Hong Kong
2004	(Philippines) Manila	China	Japan	South Korea
2005	(Malaysia) Kota Kinabalu	China	Hong Kong	South Korea
2005	(Malaysia) Kota Kinabalu	China	Hong Kong	Vietnam
2007	(China) Nantong	China	South Korea	Japan
2007	(China) Nantong	China	South Korea	Hong Kong
2008	(Thailand) Bangkok	China	South Korea	Japan
2008	(Thailand) Bangkok	China	South Korea	Hong Kong
2009	(Qatar) Doha	China	South Korea	Hong Kong
2009	(Qatar) Doha	China	South Korea	Japan
2010	(South Korea) Seoul	China	South Korea	Hong Kong
2010	(South Korea) Seoul	China	South Korea	Kazakhstan
2011	(South Korea) Seoul	South Korea	China	Japan
2011	(South Korea) Seoul	South Korea	China	Kazakhstan
2012	(Japan) Wakayama	South Korea	China	Japan
2012	(Japan) Wakayama	South Korea	China	Kazakhstan
2013	(China) Shanghai	South Korea	China	Kazakhstan
2013	(China) Shanghai	South Korea	China	Hong Kong
2014	(South Korea) Suwon	China	South Korea	Kazakhstan
2014	(South Korea) Suwon	China	South Korea	Hong Kong
2015	Singapore	South Korea	China	Japan
2015	Singapore	South Korea	China	Hong Kong
2016	(China) Wuxi	China	South Korea	Japan
2016	(China) Wuxi	China	South Korea	Kazakhstan
2017	Hong Kong	China	South Korea	Japan
2017	Hong Kong	China	South Korea	Hong Kong
2018	(Thailand) Bangkok	China	South Korea	Kazakhstan
2018	(Thailand) Bangkok	China	South Korea	Hong Kong
2019	(Japan) Chiba	China	South Korea	Japan
2019	(Japan) Chiba	China	South Korea	Kazakhstan
2022	(South Korea) Seoul	South Korea	Japan	China
2022	(South Korea) Seoul	South Korea	Japan	Kazakhstan
2023	(China) Wuxi	South Korea	China	Japan
2023	(China) Wuxi	South Korea	China	Hong Kong
2024	Kuwait City	China	Kazakhstan	South Korea
2024	Kuwait City	China	Kazakhstan	Japan
2025	(Indonesia) Bali	Japan	South Korea	Uzbekistan
2025	(Indonesia) Bali	Japan	South Korea	China
2026	(India) New Delhi	South Korea	Japan	China
2026	(India) New Delhi	South Korea	Japan	Uzbekistan

== See also ==
- Fencing at the Summer Olympics
- World Fencing Championships
- other zone championships: African Fencing Championships, European Fencing Championships, Pan American Fencing Championships
