= 2007 Asian Fencing Championships =

- Host city: Nantong, China
- Dates: 22–27 August 2007

The 2007 Asian Fencing Championships were held in Nantong, China from 22 August to 27 August 2007.

== Medal summary ==
=== Men ===
Event	Gold	Silver	Bronze
Individual épée	Ju Hyun-seung; South Korea	Sergey Khodos; Kazakhstan	Wang Lei; China
Individual épée	Ju Hyun-seung; South Korea	Sergey Khodos; Kazakhstan	Shogo Nishida; Japan
Team épée	China; Li Guojie; Wang Lei; Xie Yongjun; Yin Lianchi	Kazakhstan; Elmir Alimzhanov; Alexandr Axenov; Sergey Khodos; Sergey Shabalin	South Korea; Ju Hyun-seung; Jung Jin-sun; Kim Hee-kang; Kim Seung-gu
Team épée	China; Li Guojie; Wang Lei; Xie Yongjun; Yin Lianchi	Kazakhstan; Elmir Alimzhanov; Alexandr Axenov; Sergey Khodos; Sergey Shabalin	Japan; Akihisa Mochida; Shogo Nishida; Shunsuke Saka; Keisuke Sakamoto
Individual foil	Yuki Ota; Japan	Huang Liangcai; China	Zhang Liangliang; China
Individual foil	Yuki Ota; Japan	Huang Liangcai; China	Yusuke Fukuda; Japan
Team foil	China; Huang Liangcai; Lei Sheng; Zhang Liangliang; Zhu Jun	Japan; Kenta Chida; Yusuke Fukuda; Kyoya Ichikawa; Yuki Ota	South Korea; Choi Byung-chul; Jung Chang-yong; Park Hee-kyung; Son Young-ki
Team foil	China; Huang Liangcai; Lei Sheng; Zhang Liangliang; Zhu Jun	Japan; Kenta Chida; Yusuke Fukuda; Kyoya Ichikawa; Yuki Ota	Hong Kong; Cheung Siu Lun; Chu Wing Hong; Lau Kwok Kin; Kevin Ngan
Individual sabre	Wang Jingzhi; China	Zhong Man; China	Kim Jung-hwan; South Korea
Individual sabre	Wang Jingzhi; China	Zhong Man; China	Zhou Hanming; China
Team sabre	China; Jiang Kelü; Wang Jingzhi; Zhong Man; Zhou Hanming	South Korea; Hwang Byung-yul; Kim Jung-hwan; Oh Eun-seok; Won Woo-young	Japan; Satoshi Ogawa; Shun Tanaka; Tatsuro Watanabe; Koji Yamamoto
Team sabre	China; Jiang Kelü; Wang Jingzhi; Zhong Man; Zhou Hanming	South Korea; Hwang Byung-yul; Kim Jung-hwan; Oh Eun-seok; Won Woo-young	Iran; Mojtaba Abedini; Parviz Darvishi; Hamed Khaleghi; Hamid Reza Taherkhani

=== Women ===
Event	Gold	Silver	Bronze
Individual épée	Li Na; China	Amber Parkinson; Australia	Luo Xiaojuan; China
Individual épée	Li Na; China	Amber Parkinson; Australia	Zhang Li; China
Team épée	China; Li Na; Luo Xiaojuan; Zhang Li; Zhong Weiping	South Korea; Jung Hyo-jung; Moon Sun-kyeong; Shin A-lam; Yoo Eun-kyoung	Japan; Megumi Harada; Shizuka Ikehata; Nozomi Nakano; Hiroko Narita
Team épée	China; Li Na; Luo Xiaojuan; Zhang Li; Zhong Weiping	South Korea; Jung Hyo-jung; Moon Sun-kyeong; Shin A-lam; Yoo Eun-kyoung	Hong Kong; Bjork Cheng; Hui Pik Hung; Sabrina Lui; Yeung Chui Ling
Individual foil	Zhang Lei; China	Su Wanwen; China	Chieko Sugawara; Japan
Individual foil	Zhang Lei; China	Su Wanwen; China	Jung Gil-ok; South Korea
Team foil	China; Huang Jialing; Su Wanwen; Sun Chao; Zhang Lei	South Korea; Jung Gil-ok; Lee Hye-sun; Nam Hyun-hee; Oh Ha-na	Japan; Kanae Ikehata; Maki Kawanishi; Yoko Makishita; Chieko Sugawara
Team foil	China; Huang Jialing; Su Wanwen; Sun Chao; Zhang Lei	South Korea; Jung Gil-ok; Lee Hye-sun; Nam Hyun-hee; Oh Ha-na	Singapore; Ruth Ng; Serene Ser; Tay Yu Ling; Wang Wenying
Individual sabre	Tan Xue; China	Bao Yingying; China	Seira Nakayama; Japan
Individual sabre	Tan Xue; China	Bao Yingying; China	Kim Keum-hwa; South Korea
Team sabre	China; Bao Yingying; Huang Haiyang; Tan Xue; Zhao Yuanyuan	South Korea; Jung Eun-hee; Kim Hye-lim; Kim Keum-hwa; Lee Shin-mi	Japan; Madoka Hisagae; Sakura Kaneko; Haruko Nakamura; Seira Nakayama
Team sabre	China; Bao Yingying; Huang Haiyang; Tan Xue; Zhao Yuanyuan	South Korea; Jung Eun-hee; Kim Hye-lim; Kim Keum-hwa; Lee Shin-mi	Hong Kong; Au Sin Ying; Au Yeung Wai Sum; Chow Tsz Ki; Lau Hei Man

== Medal table ==
Rank	Nation	Gold	Silver	Bronze	Total
1	China	10	4	5	19
2	South Korea	1	4	5	10
3	Japan	1	1	9	11
4	Kazakhstan	0	2	0	2
5	Australia	0	1	0	1
6	Hong Kong	0	0	3	3
7	Iran	0	0	1	1
7	Singapore	0	0	1	1
Totals (8 entries)		12	12	24	48
