= 2012 Asian Fencing Championships =

- Host city: Wakayama, Japan
- Dates: 22–27 April 2012
- Main venue: Wakayama Big Wave

The 2012 Asian Fencing Championships was held in Wakayama, Japan from 22 April to 27 April 2012.

== Medal summary ==
=== Men ===
Event	Gold	Silver	Bronze
Individual épée	Jung Jin-sun; South Korea	Elmir Alimzhanov; Kazakhstan	Zhang Chengjie; China
Individual épée	Jung Jin-sun; South Korea	Elmir Alimzhanov; Kazakhstan	Li Guojie; China
Team épée	South Korea; An Sung-ho; Jung Jin-sun; Kweon Young-jun; Park Kyoung-doo	Kazakhstan; Dmitriy Alexanin; Elmir Alimzhanov; Dmitriy Gryaznov; Ruslan Kurbanov	China; Jiao Yunlong; Li Guojie; Li Zhen; Zhang Chengjie
Team épée	South Korea; An Sung-ho; Jung Jin-sun; Kweon Young-jun; Park Kyoung-doo	Kazakhstan; Dmitriy Alexanin; Elmir Alimzhanov; Dmitriy Gryaznov; Ruslan Kurbanov	Japan; Inochi Ito; Naoyuki Kitamura; Kazuyasu Minobe; Shogo Nishida
Individual foil	Lei Sheng; China	Huang Liangcai; China	Ryo Miyake; Japan
Individual foil	Lei Sheng; China	Huang Liangcai; China	Yuki Ota; Japan
Team foil	South Korea; Choi Byung-chul; Ha Tae-gyu; Heo Jun; Kim Hyo-gon	China; Huang Liangcai; Lei Sheng; Ma Jianfei; Zhu Jun	Japan; Suguru Awaji; Kenta Chida; Ryo Miyake; Yuki Ota
Team foil	South Korea; Choi Byung-chul; Ha Tae-gyu; Heo Jun; Kim Hyo-gon	China; Huang Liangcai; Lei Sheng; Ma Jianfei; Zhu Jun	Hong Kong; Cheung Siu Lun; Nicholas Choi; Kevin Ngan; Yeung Chi Ka
Individual sabre	Gu Bon-gil; South Korea	Won Woo-young; South Korea	Zhong Man; China
Individual sabre	Gu Bon-gil; South Korea	Won Woo-young; South Korea	Kim Jung-hwan; South Korea
Team sabre	China; Jiang Kelü; Liu Xiao; Wang Jingzhi; Zhong Man	South Korea; Gu Bon-gil; Kim Jung-hwan; Oh Eun-seok; Won Woo-young	Iran; Mojtaba Abedini; Mohammad Fotouhi; Ali Pakdaman; Hamid Reza Taherkhani
Team sabre	China; Jiang Kelü; Liu Xiao; Wang Jingzhi; Zhong Man	South Korea; Gu Bon-gil; Kim Jung-hwan; Oh Eun-seok; Won Woo-young	Hong Kong; Cyrus Chang; Chow Chak Man; Lam Hin Chung; Low Ho Tin

=== Women ===
Event	Gold	Silver	Bronze
Individual épée	Shin A-lam; South Korea	Sun Yujie; China	Xu Anqi; China
Individual épée	Shin A-lam; South Korea	Sun Yujie; China	Choi In-jeong; South Korea
Team épée	China; Li Na; Luo Xiaojuan; Sun Yujie; Xu Anqi	South Korea; Choi Eun-sook; Choi In-jeong; Jung Hyo-jung; Shin A-lam	Japan; Kozue Horikawa; Miho Morioka; Nozomi Nakano; Ayaka Shimookawa
Team épée	China; Li Na; Luo Xiaojuan; Sun Yujie; Xu Anqi	South Korea; Choi Eun-sook; Choi In-jeong; Jung Hyo-jung; Shin A-lam	Hong Kong; Bjork Cheng; Ma Cheuk Kwan; Yeung Chui Ling; Yeung Hiu Kwan
Individual foil	Nam Hyun-hee; South Korea	Jung Gil-ok; South Korea	Chen Jinyan; China
Individual foil	Nam Hyun-hee; South Korea	Jung Gil-ok; South Korea	Oh Ha-na; South Korea
Team foil	China; Chen Jinyan; Le Huilin; Liu Yongshi; Shi Yun	South Korea; Jeon Hee-sook; Jung Gil-ok; Nam Hyun-hee; Oh Ha-na	Japan; Kyomi Hirata; Kanae Ikehata; Chieko Sugawara; Chie Yoshizawa
Team foil	China; Chen Jinyan; Le Huilin; Liu Yongshi; Shi Yun	South Korea; Jeon Hee-sook; Jung Gil-ok; Nam Hyun-hee; Oh Ha-na	Vietnam; Nguyễn Thị Hoài Thu; Nguyễn Thị Nguyệt; Nguyễn Thị Tươi
Individual sabre	Yoon Ji-su; South Korea	Zhu Min; China	Lee Ra-jin; South Korea
Individual sabre	Yoon Ji-su; South Korea	Zhu Min; China	Tamara Pochekutova; Kazakhstan
Team sabre	South Korea; Kim A-ra; Kim Ji-yeon; Lee Ra-jin; Yoon Ji-su	China; Chen Xiaodong; Li Fei; Liu Shan; Zhu Min	Japan; Maho Hamada; Mika Kumagai; Seira Nakayama; Chizuru Oginezawa
Team sabre	South Korea; Kim A-ra; Kim Ji-yeon; Lee Ra-jin; Yoon Ji-su	China; Chen Xiaodong; Li Fei; Liu Shan; Zhu Min	Kazakhstan; Tamara Pochekutova; Tatyana Prikhodko; Yuliya Zhivitsa

== Medal table ==
Rank	Nation	Gold	Silver	Bronze	Total
1	South Korea	8	5	4	17
2	China	4	5	6	15
3	Kazakhstan	0	2	2	4
4	Japan	0	0	7	7
5	Hong Kong	0	0	3	3
6	Iran	0	0	1	1
6	Vietnam	0	0	1	1
Totals (7 entries)		12	12	24	48
