= Au Yeung Wai Sum =

Hong Kong fencer

Au Yeung Wai-sum
Personal information
- Born: 16 October 1984 (age 41)

Fencing career
- Sport: Fencing
- Country: Hong Kong
- Weapon: sabre
- Hand: right-handed
- FIE ranking: current ranking
Medal record
Women's sabre
World Cup
Silver medal – second place	2010 Pattaya City	Individual
Asian Games
Bronze medal – third place	2006 Doha	Team
Bronze medal – third place	2010 Guangzhou	Team
Asian Championships
Silver medal – second place	2001 Bangkok	Team
Silver medal – second place	2005 Kota Kinabalu	Team
Bronze medal – third place	2003 Chiang Mai	Team
Bronze medal – third place	2004 Manila	Team
Bronze medal – third place	2007 Nantong	Team
Bronze medal – third place	2008 Bangkok	Team
Bronze medal – third place	2009 Doha	Team
Bronze medal – third place	2010 Seoul	Team
Bronze medal – third place	2013 Shanghai	Team
East Asian Games
Bronze medal – third place	2013 Tianjin	Team
Summer Universiade
Bronze medal – third place	2011 Shenzhen	Individual

Catherine Au Yeung Wai-sum (Chinese: 歐陽慧心; Jyutping: au^{1} joeng^{4} wai^{3} sam^{1}; born 16 October 1984) is a sabre fencer from Hong Kong, China.

Au Yeung took up fencing with some of her friends. She joined the national team in 2004 after being noticed by a national coach at an inter-school competition. She won a team silver medal at the 2005 Asian Championships and a team bronze medal at the 2006 Asian Games. She won a silver medal in the 2010 Pattaya City World Cup. In the 2011 Summer Universiade she reached the semifinals after defeating Romania's Mihaela Bulică, then lost to another Romanian, Bianca Pascu, and came away with a bronze medal.

Au Yeung graduated in marketing from Hong Kong Polytechnic University.
