= 2010 Asian Fencing Championships =

- Host city: Seoul, South Korea
- Dates: 8–13 July 2010
- Main venue: Olympic Fencing Gymnasium

The 2010 Asian Fencing Championships were held in Seoul, South Korea from 8 July to 13 July 2010.

== Medal summary ==
=== Men ===
Event	Gold	Silver	Bronze
Individual épée	Kim Seung-gu; South Korea	Shogo Nishida; Japan	Park Kyoung-doo; South Korea
Individual épée	Kim Seung-gu; South Korea	Shogo Nishida; Japan	Kim Sang-min; South Korea
Team épée	South Korea; Jung Seung-hwa; Kim Sang-min; Kim Seung-gu; Park Kyoung-doo	China; Dong Chao; Li Guojie; Wang Feng; Yin Lianchi	Kazakhstan; Elmir Alimzhanov; Alexandr Axenov; Dmitriy Gryaznov; Sergey Shabalin
Team épée	South Korea; Jung Seung-hwa; Kim Sang-min; Kim Seung-gu; Park Kyoung-doo	China; Dong Chao; Li Guojie; Wang Feng; Yin Lianchi	Hong Kong; Lau Kam Tan; Leung Ka Ming; Tsui Yiu Chung; Wu Siu Cheung
Individual foil	Huang Liangcai; China	Lei Sheng; China	Ryo Miyake; Japan
Individual foil	Huang Liangcai; China	Lei Sheng; China	Zhu Jun; China
Team foil	China; Huang Liangcai; Lei Sheng; Zhang Liangliang; Zhu Jun	Japan; Suguru Awaji; Kenta Chida; Ryo Miyake; Yuki Ota	South Korea; Choi Byung-chul; Ha Tae-gyu; Kwon Young-ho; Park Hee-kyung
Team foil	China; Huang Liangcai; Lei Sheng; Zhang Liangliang; Zhu Jun	Japan; Suguru Awaji; Kenta Chida; Ryo Miyake; Yuki Ota	Hong Kong; Cheung Siu Lun; Chu Wing Hong; Lau Kwok Kin; Kevin Ngan
Individual sabre	Gu Bon-gil; South Korea	Oh Eun-seok; South Korea	Jiang Kelü; China
Individual sabre	Gu Bon-gil; South Korea	Oh Eun-seok; South Korea	Wang Jingzhi; China
Team sabre	China; He Wei; Jiang Kelü; Wang Jingzhi; Zhong Man	South Korea; Gu Bon-gil; Kim Jung-hwan; Oh Eun-seok; Won Woo-young	Iran; Mojtaba Abedini; Parviz Darvishi; Amin Ghorbani; Hamid Reza Taherkhani
Team sabre	China; He Wei; Jiang Kelü; Wang Jingzhi; Zhong Man	South Korea; Gu Bon-gil; Kim Jung-hwan; Oh Eun-seok; Won Woo-young	Japan; Satoshi Ogawa; Shun Tanaka; Kenta Tokunan; Koji Yamamoto

=== Women ===
Event	Gold	Silver	Bronze
Individual épée	Jung Hyo-jung; South Korea	Luo Xiaojuan; China	Yin Mingfang; China
Individual épée	Jung Hyo-jung; South Korea	Luo Xiaojuan; China	Oh Yun-hee; South Korea
Team épée	China; Luo Xiaojuan; Sun Yujie; Xu Anqi; Yin Mingfang	South Korea; Jung Hyo-jung; Oh Yun-hee; Park Se-ra; Shin A-lam	Hong Kong; Bjork Cheng; Cheung Sik Lui; Sabrina Lui; Yeung Chui Ling
Team épée	China; Luo Xiaojuan; Sun Yujie; Xu Anqi; Yin Mingfang	South Korea; Jung Hyo-jung; Oh Yun-hee; Park Se-ra; Shin A-lam	Chinese Taipei; Chang Chia-ling; Chen Yin-hua; Cheng Ya-wen; Hsu Jo-ting
Individual foil	Nam Hyun-hee; South Korea	Jeon Hee-sook; South Korea	Oh Ha-na; South Korea
Individual foil	Nam Hyun-hee; South Korea	Jeon Hee-sook; South Korea	Kanae Ikehata; Japan
Team foil	South Korea; Jeon Hee-sook; Lim Seung-min; Nam Hyun-hee; Oh Ha-na	Japan; Kyomi Hirata; Kanae Ikehata; Shiho Nishioka; Chie Yoshizawa	China; Chen Jinyan; Dai Huili; Le Huilin; Shi Yun
Team foil	South Korea; Jeon Hee-sook; Lim Seung-min; Nam Hyun-hee; Oh Ha-na	Japan; Kyomi Hirata; Kanae Ikehata; Shiho Nishioka; Chie Yoshizawa	Singapore; Ruth Ng; Tay Yu Ling; Wang Wenying; Cheryl Wong
Individual sabre	Tan Xue; China	Zhu Min; China	Kim Keum-hwa; South Korea
Individual sabre	Tan Xue; China	Zhu Min; China	Mo Hyo-jung; South Korea
Team sabre	China; Bao Yingying; Ni Hong; Tan Xue; Zhu Min	South Korea; Kim Hye-lim; Kim Keum-hwa; Lee Ra-jin; Mo Hyo-jung	Hong Kong; Au Sin Ying; Au Yeung Wai Sum; Fong Yi Tak; Lam Hin Wai
Team sabre	China; Bao Yingying; Ni Hong; Tan Xue; Zhu Min	South Korea; Kim Hye-lim; Kim Keum-hwa; Lee Ra-jin; Mo Hyo-jung	Kazakhstan; Aliya Bekturganova; Anastassiya Gimatdinova; Tamara Pochekutova; Yuliya Zhivitsa

== Medal table ==
Rank	Nation	Gold	Silver	Bronze	Total
1	South Korea	6	5	7	18
2	China	6	4	5	15
3	Japan	0	3	3	6
4	Hong Kong	0	0	4	4
5	Kazakhstan	0	0	2	2
6	Chinese Taipei	0	0	1	1
6	Iran	0	0	1	1
6	Singapore	0	0	1	1
Totals (8 entries)		12	12	24	48
