= 2011 Asian Fencing Championships =

- Host city: Seoul, South Korea
- Dates: 8–13 July 2011
- Main venue: Olympic Fencing Gymnasium

The 2011 Asian Fencing Championships was held in Seoul, South Korea from 8 July to 13 July 2011.

== Medal summary ==
=== Men ===
| Event | Gold | Silver | Bronze |
|---|---|---|---|
| Individual épée | Jung Jin-sun; South Korea | Elmir Alimzhanov; Kazakhstan | Li Guojie; China |
| Individual épée | Jung Jin-sun; South Korea | Elmir Alimzhanov; Kazakhstan | Park Kyoung-doo; South Korea |
| Team épée | South Korea; Jung Jin-sun; Jung Seung-hwa; Kim Won-jin; Park Kyoung-doo | China; Li Guojie; Wang Lei; Wang Sen; Yin Lianchi | Kyrgyzstan; Aleksandr Chernykh; Mikhail Ivanov; Serguei Katchiourine; Evgeny Naumkin |
| Team épée | South Korea; Jung Jin-sun; Jung Seung-hwa; Kim Won-jin; Park Kyoung-doo | China; Li Guojie; Wang Lei; Wang Sen; Yin Lianchi | Kazakhstan; Dmitriy Alexanin; Elmir Alimzhanov; Dmitriy Gryaznov; Ruslan Kurbanov |
| Individual foil | Kwon Young-ho; South Korea | Kenta Chida; Japan | Huang Liangcai; China |
| Individual foil | Kwon Young-ho; South Korea | Kenta Chida; Japan | Zhu Jun; China |
| Team foil | China; Huang Liangcai; Lei Sheng; Zhang Liangliang; Zhu Jun | Japan; Suguru Awaji; Kenta Chida; Ryo Miyake; Yuki Ota | South Korea; Choi Byung-chul; Heo Jun; Jung Chang-yong; Kwon Young-ho |
| Team foil | China; Huang Liangcai; Lei Sheng; Zhang Liangliang; Zhu Jun | Japan; Suguru Awaji; Kenta Chida; Ryo Miyake; Yuki Ota | Hong Kong; Cheung Siu Lun; Nicholas Choi; Chu Wing Hong; Kevin Ngan |
| Individual sabre | Won Woo-young; South Korea | Gu Bon-gil; South Korea | Oh Eun-seok; South Korea |
| Individual sabre | Won Woo-young; South Korea | Gu Bon-gil; South Korea | Liu Xiao; China |
| Team sabre | South Korea; Gu Bon-gil; Kim Jung-hwan; Oh Eun-seok; Won Woo-young | China; Jiang Kelü; Liu Xiao; Wang Jingzhi; Zhong Man | Hong Kong; Cyrus Chang; Lam Hin Chung; Low Ho Tin; Yan Hon Pan |
| Team sabre | South Korea; Gu Bon-gil; Kim Jung-hwan; Oh Eun-seok; Won Woo-young | China; Jiang Kelü; Liu Xiao; Wang Jingzhi; Zhong Man | Kazakhstan; Andrey Balabayev; Yevgeniy Frolov; Yerali Tilenshiyev; Zhanserik Turlybekov |

=== Women ===
| Event | Gold | Silver | Bronze |
|---|---|---|---|
| Individual épée | Choi In-jeong; South Korea | Luo Xiaojuan; China | Shin A-lam; South Korea |
| Individual épée | Choi In-jeong; South Korea | Luo Xiaojuan; China | Yin Mingfang; China |
| Team épée | China; Luo Xiaojuan; Sun Yujie; Xu Anqi; Yin Mingfang | South Korea; Choi Eun-sook; Choi In-jeong; Oh Yun-hee; Shin A-lam | Japan; Kozue Horikawa; Megumi Ikeda; Nozomi Nakano; Ayaka Shimookawa |
| Team épée | China; Luo Xiaojuan; Sun Yujie; Xu Anqi; Yin Mingfang | South Korea; Choi Eun-sook; Choi In-jeong; Oh Yun-hee; Shin A-lam | Hong Kong; Bjork Cheng; Cheung Sik Lui; Vivian Kong; Yeung Chui Ling |
| Individual foil | Nam Hyun-hee; South Korea | Jung Gil-ok; South Korea | Liu Yongshi; China |
| Individual foil | Nam Hyun-hee; South Korea | Jung Gil-ok; South Korea | Le Huilin; China |
| Team foil | South Korea; Jeon Hee-sook; Jung Gil-ok; Lee Hye-sun; Nam Hyun-hee | Japan; Kyomi Hirata; Kanae Ikehata; Shiho Nishioka; Chie Yoshizawa | China; Chen Jinyan; Le Huilin; Liu Yongshi; Sun Chao |
| Team foil | South Korea; Jeon Hee-sook; Jung Gil-ok; Lee Hye-sun; Nam Hyun-hee | Japan; Kyomi Hirata; Kanae Ikehata; Shiho Nishioka; Chie Yoshizawa | Hong Kong; Cheung Ho King; Lin Po Heung; Liu Yan Wai; Lisa To |
| Individual sabre | Chen Xiaodong; China | Lee Ra-jin; South Korea | Zhu Min; China |
| Individual sabre | Chen Xiaodong; China | Lee Ra-jin; South Korea | Kim Keum-hwa; South Korea |
| Team sabre | South Korea; Kim Ji-yeon; Kim Keum-hwa; Kim Seon-hee; Lee Ra-jin | China; Chen Xiaodong; Ni Hong; Tan Xue; Zhu Min | Japan; Chika Aoki; Maho Hamada; Seira Nakayama; Chizuru Oginezawa |
| Team sabre | South Korea; Kim Ji-yeon; Kim Keum-hwa; Kim Seon-hee; Lee Ra-jin | China; Chen Xiaodong; Ni Hong; Tan Xue; Zhu Min | Kazakhstan; Aliya Bekturganova; Tamara Pochekutova; Yuliya Zhivitsa |

== Medal table ==
| Rank | Nation | Gold | Silver | Bronze | Total |
|---|---|---|---|---|---|
| 1 | South Korea | 9 | 4 | 5 | 18 |
| 2 | China | 3 | 4 | 9 | 16 |
| 3 | Japan | 0 | 3 | 2 | 5 |
| 4 | Kazakhstan | 0 | 1 | 3 | 4 |
| 5 | Hong Kong | 0 | 0 | 4 | 4 |
| 6 | Kyrgyzstan | 0 | 0 | 1 | 1 |
| Totals (6 entries) | | 12 | 12 | 24 | 48 |
