= Bjork Cheng =

Hong Kong fencer

Medal record

Women's Epée

Representing Hong Kong

Asian Games
Bronze medal – third place	2006 Doha	Team
Bronze medal – third place	2010 Guangzhou	Team
Bronze medal – third place	2014 Incheon	Team

Asian Championships
Bronze medal – third place	2003 Chiang Mai	Team
Bronze medal – third place	2004 Manila	Team
Bronze medal – third place	2005 Kota Kinabalu	Team
Bronze medal – third place	2007 Nantong	Team
Bronze medal – third place	2008 Bangkok	Team
Bronze medal – third place	2009 Doha	Team
Bronze medal – third place	2010 Seoul	Team
Bronze medal – third place	2011 Seoul	Team
Bronze medal – third place	2012 Wakayama	Team
Bronze medal – third place	2013 Shanghai	Team

Cheng Yuk Han Bjork (Chinese: 鄭玉嫻; Jyutping: zeng^{6} juk^{6} haan^{4}; born 21 June 1980) is a fencer from Hong Kong, China who won three bronze medals in the women's épée team competition at the 2002 Busan Asian Games, 2006 Asian Games and 2010 Asian Games.

She attended Kit Sam Secondary School and is a physiotherapy graduate from the Hong Kong Polytechnic University.

Hong Kong Elite Athlete Association http://hk.myblog.yahoo.com/hkeaa_chengyukhan
