= 2008 Asian Fencing Championships =

- Host city: Bangkok, Thailand
- Dates: 24–29 April 2008

The 2008 Asian Fencing Championships was held in Bangkok, Thailand from 24 April to 29 April 2008.

== Medal summary ==
=== Men ===
Event	Gold	Silver	Bronze
Individual épée	Kim Won-jin; South Korea	Elmir Alimzhanov; Kazakhstan	Li Guojie; China
Individual épée	Kim Won-jin; South Korea	Elmir Alimzhanov; Kazakhstan	Mohammad Rezaei; Iran
Team épée	South Korea; Ju Hyun-seung; Jung Jin-sun; Kim Seung-gu; Kim Won-jin	Kazakhstan; Elmir Alimzhanov; Dmitriy Gryaznov; Sergey Khodos; Sergey Panteleyev	China; Dong Guotao; Li Guojie; Wang Lei; Yin Lianchi
Team épée	South Korea; Ju Hyun-seung; Jung Jin-sun; Kim Seung-gu; Kim Won-jin	Kazakhstan; Elmir Alimzhanov; Dmitriy Gryaznov; Sergey Khodos; Sergey Panteleyev	Iran; Siamak Feiz-Asgari; Mohammad Rezaei; Hamed Sedaghati; Ali Yaghoubian
Individual foil	Yuki Ota; Japan	Zhu Jun; China	Zhang Liangliang; China
Individual foil	Yuki Ota; Japan	Zhu Jun; China	Lei Sheng; China
Team foil	China; Huang Liangcai; Lei Sheng; Zhang Liangliang; Zhu Jun	Japan; Kenta Chida; Yusuke Fukuda; Kyoya Ichikawa; Yuki Ota	South Korea; Choi Byung-chul; Jang Dong-sub; Park Jae-min; Yoo Si-gook
Team foil	China; Huang Liangcai; Lei Sheng; Zhang Liangliang; Zhu Jun	Japan; Kenta Chida; Yusuke Fukuda; Kyoya Ichikawa; Yuki Ota	Hong Kong; Cheung Siu Lun; Chu Wing Hong; Lau Kwok Kin; Kevin Ngan
Individual sabre	Zhong Man; China	Zhou Hanming; China	Wiradech Kothny; Thailand
Individual sabre	Zhong Man; China	Zhou Hanming; China	Oh Eun-seok; South Korea
Team sabre	China; Chen Taotao; Wang Jingzhi; Zhong Man; Zhou Hanming	South Korea; Hong Bum-suk; Kim Jung-hwan; Kim Jung-min; Oh Eun-seok	Iran; Mojtaba Abedini; Parviz Darvishi; Amin Ghorbani; Hamid Reza Taherkhani
Team sabre	China; Chen Taotao; Wang Jingzhi; Zhong Man; Zhou Hanming	South Korea; Hong Bum-suk; Kim Jung-hwan; Kim Jung-min; Oh Eun-seok	Hong Kong; Lam Hin Chung; Lok Ka Fai; Low Ho Tin; Tse Yu Ming

=== Women ===
Event	Gold	Silver	Bronze
Individual épée	Li Na; China	Luo Xiaojuan; China	Amber Parkinson; Australia
Individual épée	Li Na; China	Luo Xiaojuan; China	Zhang Li; China
Team épée	China; Li Na; Luo Xiaojuan; Zhang Li; Zhong Weiping	Japan; Megumi Harada; Nozomi Nakano; Hiroko Narita; Izumi Taka	Hong Kong; Bjork Cheng; Cheung Sik Lui; Sabrina Lui; Yeung Chui Ling
Team épée	China; Li Na; Luo Xiaojuan; Zhang Li; Zhong Weiping	Japan; Megumi Harada; Nozomi Nakano; Hiroko Narita; Izumi Taka	South Korea; Choi Jung-mi; Jung Hyo-jung; Kim Bo-mi; Lee Soon-hwa
Individual foil	Chieko Sugawara; Japan	Sun Chao; China	Su Wanwen; China
Individual foil	Chieko Sugawara; Japan	Sun Chao; China	Huang Jialing; China
Team foil	China; Huang Jialing; Su Wanwen; Sun Chao; Zhang Lei	Japan; Hitomi Matsuki; Yuki Mori; Shiho Nishioka; Chieko Sugawara	Kazakhstan; Olga Antipova; Irina Fichshenko; Natalya Kazantseva
Team foil	China; Huang Jialing; Su Wanwen; Sun Chao; Zhang Lei	Japan; Hitomi Matsuki; Yuki Mori; Shiho Nishioka; Chieko Sugawara	Hong Kong; Cheung Yin Yi; Liu Yan Wai; Lin Po Heung; To Pui Yin
Individual sabre	Tan Xue; China	Huang Haiyang; China	Lee Shin-mi; South Korea
Individual sabre	Tan Xue; China	Huang Haiyang; China	Madoka Hisagae; Japan
Team sabre	China; Bao Yingying; Chen Xiaodong; Huang Haiyang; Tan Xue	South Korea; Kim Keum-hwa; Lee Shin-mi; Seo Hye-ri	Japan; Madoka Hisagae; Chinatsu Karasawa; Seira Nakayama; Chizuru Oginezawa
Team sabre	China; Bao Yingying; Chen Xiaodong; Huang Haiyang; Tan Xue	South Korea; Kim Keum-hwa; Lee Shin-mi; Seo Hye-ri	Hong Kong; Au Yeung Wai Sum; Chow Tsz Ki; Lam Hin Wai; Yu Qunli

== Medal table ==
Rank	Nation	Gold	Silver	Bronze	Total
1	China	8	5	7	20
2	Japan	2	3	2	7
3	South Korea	2	2	4	8
4	Kazakhstan	0	2	1	3
5	Hong Kong	0	0	5	5
6	Iran	0	0	3	3
7	Australia	0	0	1	1
7	Thailand	0	0	1	1
Totals (8 entries)		12	12	24	48
