= Chow Tsz Ki =

Hong Kong fencer

Personal information
- Born: 12 October 1982 (age 43)

Sport
- Sport: Fencing
Medal record
Women's fencing
Representing Hong Kong
Grand Prix
Silver medal – second place	2007 Tianjin	Individual
Bronze medal – third place	2005 Hanoi	Individual
Asian Games
Bronze medal – third place	2006 Doha	Individual
Bronze medal – third place	2006 Doha	Team
Asian Championships
Silver medal – second place	2001 Bangkok	Team
Silver medal – second place	2005 Kota Kinabalu	Team
Silver medal – second place	2009 Doha	Individual
Bronze medal – third place	2003 Chiang Mai	Individual
Bronze medal – third place	2003 Chiang Mai	Team
Bronze medal – third place	2004 Manila	Team
Bronze medal – third place	2007 Nantong	Team
Bronze medal – third place	2008 Bangkok	Team
Bronze medal – third place	2009 Doha	Team

Chow Tsz Ki (Chinese: 周梓淇; Jyutping: zau^{1} zi^{2} kei^{4}; born in Hong Kong) is a fencer from Hong Kong who won two bronze medals at the 2006 Asian Games in the women's sabre individual and team competitions. Her coach, Andras Decsi, is from Hungary and once worked with the Hong Kong Sabre Fencing Team. She also competed at the 2004 and 2008 Olympic Games. Chow is the most decorated female fencer from Hong Kong in the Asian Championships with 3 silver and 6 bronze medals, including two individual medals.
