= Elmir Alimzhanov =

Kazakhstani fencer (born 1986)

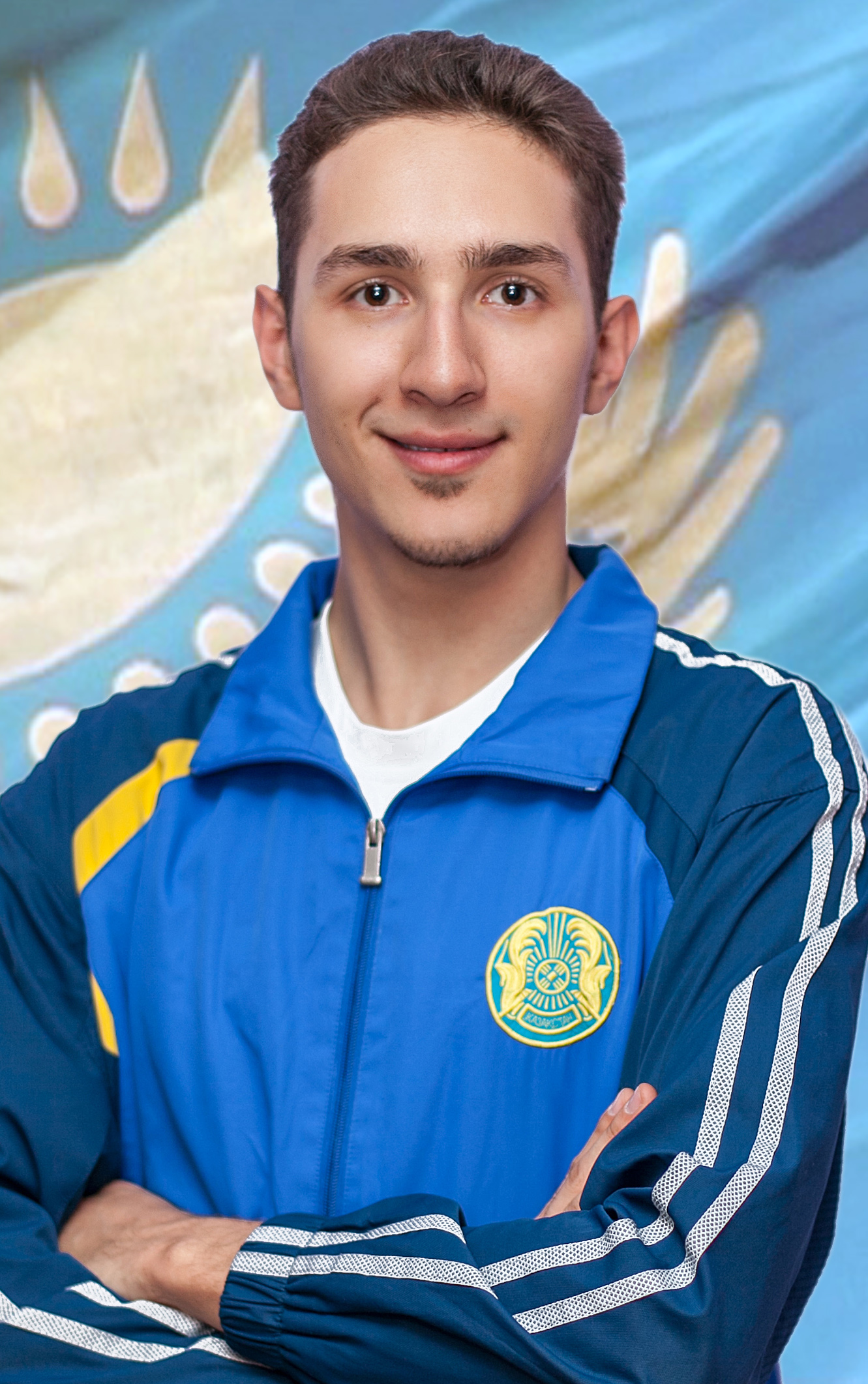

Personal information
- Born: 5 October 1986 (age 39) Alma-Ata, Kazakh SSR, Soviet Union
- Height: 1.85 m (6 ft 1 in)
- Weight: 72 kg (159 lb)

Fencing career
- Sport: Fencing
- Country: Kazakhstan
- Weapon: épée
- Hand: right-handed
- FIE ranking: current ranking
Medal record
Men's épée
Representing Kazakhstan
World Championships
Bronze medal – third place	2025 Tbilisi	Team
Asian Games
Silver medal – second place	2010 Guangzhou	Team
Silver medal – second place	2022 Hangzhou	Team
Bronze medal – third place	2022 Hangzhou	Individual
Bronze medal – third place	2014 Incheon	Team
Bronze medal – third place	2018 Jakarta	Team
Asian Championships
Gold medal – first place	2013 Shanghai	Individual
Gold medal – first place	2013 Shanghai	Team
Gold medal – first place	2015 Singapore	Team
Gold medal – first place	2024 Kuwait City	Team
Silver medal – second place	2008 Bangkok	Individual
Silver medal – second place	2011 Seoul	Individual
Silver medal – second place	2012 Wakayama	Individual
Silver medal – second place	2007 Bangkok	Team
Silver medal – second place	2008 Bangkok	Team
Silver medal – second place	2009 Doha	Team
Silver medal – second place	2012 Wakayama	Team
Silver medal – second place	2018 Bangkok	Team
Silver medal – second place	2023 Wuxi	Team
Bronze medal – third place	2015 Singapore	Individual
Bronze medal – third place	2010 Seoul	Team
Bronze medal – third place	2011 Seoul	Team
Bronze medal – third place	2016 Wuxi	Team
Bronze medal – third place	2019 Chiba	Team
Summer Universiade
Bronze medal – third place	2013 Kazan	Team

Elmir Alimzhanov (Kazakh: Эльмир Эльдарович Алимжанов; born 5 October 1986, in Alma-Ata) is a Kazakhstani right-handed fencer. He ranked 2nd in the Fencing Asian Championships 2008, 2011, and 2012 and 1st in the Asian Championship 2013. Alimzhanov took part in the 2012 Summer Olympics, ranking 11th in the men's épée event. He also competed for Kazakhstan at the 2024 Summer Olympics in the men's épée and men's team épée events.
