= 2001 Asian Fencing Championships =

- Host city: Bangkok, Thailand
- Dates: 4–9 August 2001

The 2001 Asian Fencing Championships were held in Bangkok, Thailand from 4 August to 9 August 2001.

== Medal summary ==
=== Men ===
Event	Gold	Silver	Bronze
Individual épée	Zhao Gang; China	Xie Yongjun; China	Kim Sang-hyun; South Korea
Individual épée	Zhao Gang; China	Xie Yongjun; China	Wang Lei; China
Team épée	South Korea	China	Iran
Individual foil	Zhou Rui; China	Jang Suk-jae; South Korea	Naoto Okazaki; Japan
Individual foil	Zhou Rui; China	Jang Suk-jae; South Korea	Kim Sang-hun; South Korea
Team foil	China	South Korea	Japan
Individual sabre	Won Woo-young; South Korea	Zhao Chunsheng; China	Kim Do-hun; South Korea
Individual sabre	Won Woo-young; South Korea	Zhao Chunsheng; China	Ni Jun; China
Team sabre	China	South Korea	Iran

=== Women ===
Event	Gold	Silver	Bronze
Individual épée	Zhang Li; China	Li Na; China	Megumi Harada; Japan
Individual épée	Zhang Li; China	Li Na; China	Zhong Weiping; China
Team épée	China	Japan	Hong Kong
Individual foil	Nam Hyun-hee; South Korea	Zhang Lei; China	Liu Yuan; China
Individual foil	Nam Hyun-hee; South Korea	Zhang Lei; China	Ma Na; China
Team foil	China	Japan	South Korea
Individual sabre	Huang Haiyang; China	Bao Yingying; China	Miyuki Kano; Japan
Individual sabre	Huang Haiyang; China	Bao Yingying; China	Li Li; China
Team sabre	South Korea	Hong Kong	China

== Medal table ==
Rank	Nation	Gold	Silver	Bronze	Total
1	China	8	6	7	21
2	South Korea	4	3	4	11
3	Japan	0	2	4	6
4	Hong Kong	0	1	1	2
5	Iran	0	0	2	2
Totals (5 entries)		12	12	18	42
