= Oh Eun-seok =

South Korean fencer (born 1983)

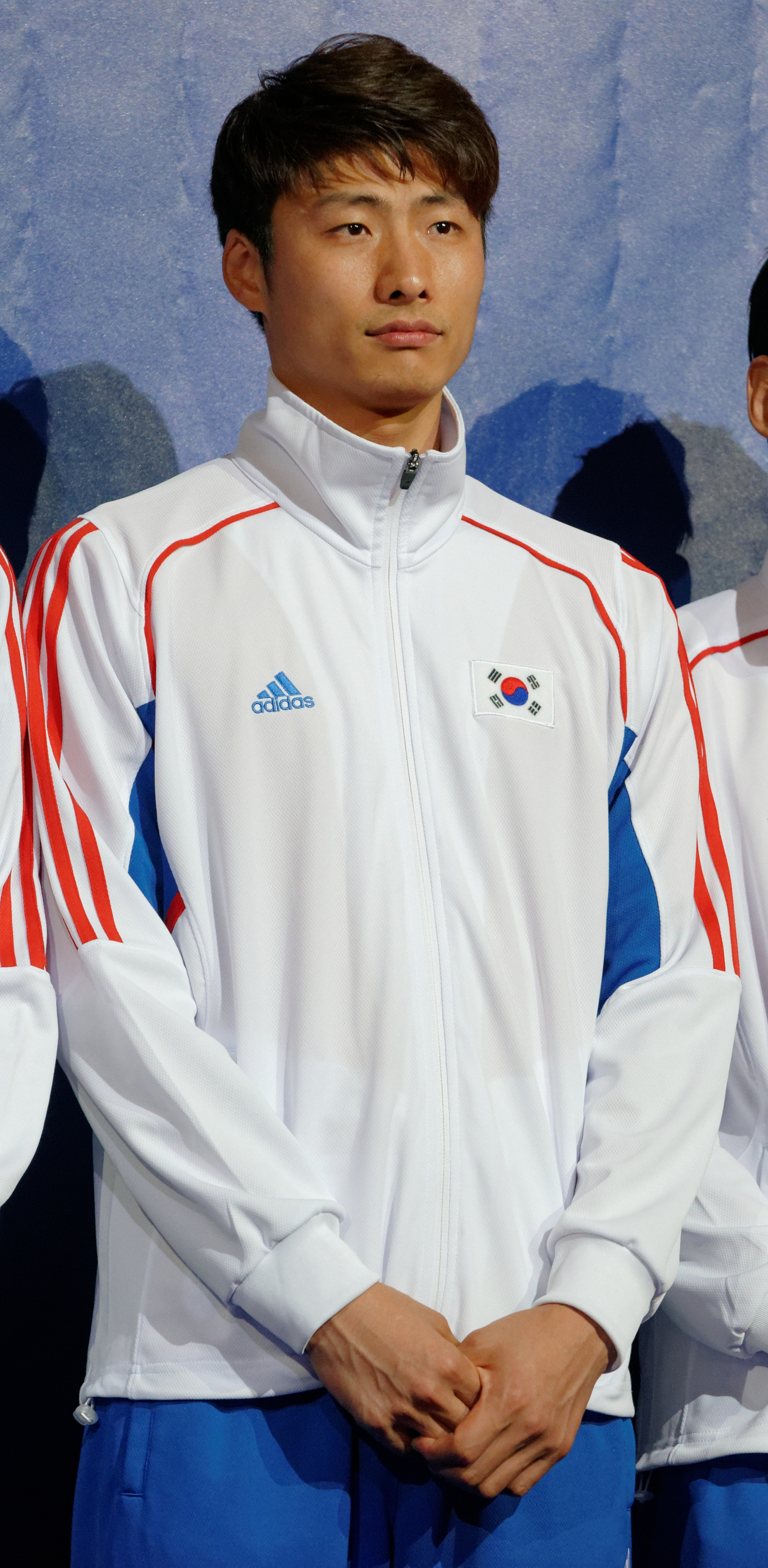
- Oh at the 2013 World Championships

Personal information
- Born: 2 April 1983 (age 43) Daegu, South Korea
- Height: 181 cm (5 ft 11 in)

Fencing career
- Sport: Fencing
- Country: South Korea
- Weapon: Sabre
- Hand: Left-handed
- Years on national team: 2003–2015
- Highest ranking: 2 (2009–2010)
Medal record
Event	1st	2nd	3rd
Olympic Games	1	0	0
Asian Games	1	3	1
World Championships	0	1	2
Asian Championships	4	6	3
Olympic Games
Gold medal – first place	2012 London	Team
World Championships
Silver medal – second place	2014 Kazan	Team
Bronze medal – third place	2007 St. Petersburg	Individual
Bronze medal – third place	2013 Budapest	Team
Asian Games
Gold medal – first place	2014 Incheon	Team
Silver medal – second place	2006 Doha	Individual
Silver medal – second place	2006 Doha	Team
Silver medal – second place	2010 Guangzhou	Team
Bronze medal – third place	2010 Guangzhou	Individual
Asian Championships
Gold medal – first place	2011 Seoul	Team
Gold medal – first place	2013 Shanghai	Team
Gold medal – first place	2014 Suwon	Team
Gold medal – first place	2015 Singapore	Team
Silver medal – second place	2007 Nantong	Team
Silver medal – second place	2008 Bangkok	Team
Silver medal – second place	2009 Doha	Individual
Silver medal – second place	2010 Seoul	Individual
Silver medal – second place	2010 Seoul	Team
Silver medal – second place	2012 Wakayama	Team
Bronze medal – third place	2008 Bangkok	Individual
Bronze medal – third place	2009 Doha	Individual
Bronze medal – third place	2011 Seoul	Individual
Universiade
Silver medal – second place	2003 Daegu	Individual

- Oh Eun-seok
- Hangul: 오은석
- Hanja: 吳恩錫
- RR: O Eunseok
- MR: O Ŭnsŏk

Oh Eun-seok (Korean pronunciation: [o.ɯn.sʌk̚]; born 2 April 1983) is a South Korean retired sabre fencer. He is an Olympic and Asian Games gold medalist in the team event.

== Early life ==
A native of Daegu, Oh was a former runner and took up fencing in middle school. He attended Osung High School, one of the few high schools in the city with a fencing club. It was not until he enrolled at Dong-Eui University, known for its fencing team, that he decided to turn professional.

== Career ==
Oh won gold in team sabre and silver in individual sabre at the 2003 Junior World Fencing Championships in Trapani, Italy. He also participated in the Universiade hosted by his hometown and won silver in the individual event. In 2005 he reached the final of the Seoul Grand Prix and was defeated by his rookie national teammate Kim Jung-hwan. However, Kim's gold medal was forfeited and given to Oh after the former failed a doping test.

At the 2007 FIE World Championships he won the bronze medal in the men's individual sabre category after losing to four-time Olympic champion and ten-time world champion Stanislav Pozdnyakov of Russia 12–15 in the semifinals.

Oh qualified for the 2008 Beijing Olympics for the individual sabre competition. On August 12, 2008, he won his first round 15–8 win against Dmitri Lapkes of Belarus, but ultimately had a 15–11 loss to eventual silver medalist Nicolas Lopez of France in the round of 16. He finished 13th.

At 2012 Summer Olympics, he participated as substitute for the team sabre competition. Despite not getting his chance for participating in quarterfinal match against Germany, and semifinal match against Italy, he came out on final match against Romania on 8th bout. He faced Alexandru Sirițeanu, who came out as substitute for the Romanian side. The bout finished in just 14 seconds, when Oh accumulated 5 points for the Korean side, while conceding 1 point. Ultimately, he won gold medal along with his teammates Gu Bon-gil, Won Woo-young, and Kim Jung-hwan. The quartet continued to dominate in the team events; in the year 2014 alone they swept gold at both the Asian Championships and Asian Games hosted at home and won silver at the World Championships. They had a disappointing run at the 2015 World Championships as none of them reached the final in the individual event and then lost by only a point to France in the quarter-finals of the team event. A week later, they successfully defended their team gold medal at the Asian Championships, his last major international competition. Oh and Won both retired from the national team at the end of the season.

== Medal record ==
=== Olympic Games ===
Year	Location	Event	Position
2012	London, United Kingdom	Team Men's Sabre	1st

=== World Cup ===
Year	Location	Event	Position
2003-05-17	Warsaw, Poland	Individual Men's Sabre	3rd
2004-01-24	London, United Kingdom	Individual Men's Sabre	1st
2006-05-13	Warsaw, Poland	Individual Men's Sabre	3rd
2006-06-02	Valencia-Carabobo, Venezuela	Individual Men's Sabre	3rd
2010-05-22	Madrid, Spain	Individual Men's Sabre	1st

=== Grand Prix ===
Year	Location	Event	Position
2005-02-25	Seoul, South Korea	Individual Men's Sabre	1st
2006-07-14	Tehran, Iran	Individual Men's Sabre	2nd
2010-02-12	Moscow, Russia	Individual Men's Sabre	2nd
2010-05-28	Padua, Italy	Individual Men's Sabre	3rd

== Personal life ==
Oh married rhythmic gymnast Gim Yun-hee in May 2016. Gim is a 2014 Asian Games silver medalist in the team event.
