= 1995 Asian Fencing Championships =

- Host city: Seoul, South Korea
- Dates: 2–8 August 1995

The 1995 Asian Fencing Championships were held in Seoul, South Korea from 2 August to 8 August 1995.

== Medal summary ==
=== Men ===
Event	Gold	Silver	Bronze
Individual épée	Dmitriy Dimov; Kazakhstan	Hasan Malallah; Kuwait	Yang Roy-sung; South Korea
Individual épée	Dmitriy Dimov; Kazakhstan	Hasan Malallah; Kuwait	Cho Hee-jae; South Korea
Team épée	Kazakhstan	Japan	South Korea
Individual foil	Hiroki Ichigatani; Japan	Dong Zhaozhi; China	Chung Soo-ki; South Korea
Individual foil	Hiroki Ichigatani; Japan	Dong Zhaozhi; China	Kim Hyung-sup; South Korea
Team foil	China	South Korea	Kazakhstan
Individual sabre	You Sang-joo; South Korea	Youn Bum-duk; South Korea	Hidenori Munakata; Japan
Individual sabre	You Sang-joo; South Korea	Youn Bum-duk; South Korea	Seo Sung-jun; South Korea
Team sabre	South Korea	Kazakhstan	Japan

=== Women ===
Event	Gold	Silver	Bronze
Individual épée	Ko Jung-sun; South Korea	Kim Youn-a; South Korea	Noriko Kubo; Japan
Individual épée	Ko Jung-sun; South Korea	Kim Youn-a; South Korea	Lee Myung-hee; South Korea
Team épée	South Korea	Japan	Hong Kong
Individual foil	Lim Mi-kyung; South Korea	Kim Dong-im; South Korea	Miki Yoshimatsu; Japan
Individual foil	Lim Mi-kyung; South Korea	Kim Dong-im; South Korea	Nellya Sevostyanova; Kazakhstan
Team foil	South Korea	Kazakhstan	Japan

== Medal table ==
Rank	Nation	Gold	Silver	Bronze	Total
1	South Korea	6	4	7	17
2	Kazakhstan	2	2	2	6
3	Japan	1	2	5	8
4	China	1	1	0	2
5	Kuwait	0	1	0	1
6	Hong Kong	0	0	1	1
Totals (6 entries)		10	10	15	35
