= Kwon Young-ho =

South Korean footballer

Personal information
- Full name: Kwon Young-ho
- Date of birth: July 31, 1992 (age 34)
- Place of birth: South Korea
- Height: 1.90 m (6 ft 3 in)
- Position: Defender

Team information
- Current team: Gangneung Citizen
- Number: 4

Senior career*
Years	Team	Apps	(Gls)
2015	Gwangju FC	4	(0)
2016	Goyang Zaicro	34	(0)
2017	Fujieda MYFC		
2018–2019	Daejeon Citizen	13	(1)
2022–2023	Ansan Greeners FC	26	(3)
2024–	Gangneung Citizen	7	(0)
- * Club domestic league appearances and goals as of 4 October 2022

Kwon Young-ho (born July 31, 1992) is a South Korean football player. He plays for K3 League club Gangneung Citizen.

== Career ==
Kwon Young-ho joined J3 League club Fujieda MYFC in 2017.
