= 2004 Asian Fencing Championships =

- Host city: Manila, Philippines
- Dates: 21–26 April 2004

The 2004 Asian Fencing Championships were held in Manila, Philippines from 21 April to 26 April 2004.

== Medal summary ==
=== Men ===
| Event | Gold | Silver | Bronze |
|---|---|---|---|
| Individual épée | Kim Won-jin; South Korea | Sergey Shabalin; Kazakhstan | Alexandr Axenov; Kazakhstan |
| Individual épée | Kim Won-jin; South Korea | Sergey Shabalin; Kazakhstan | Shogo Nishida; Japan |
| Team épée | Kazakhstan | Iran | China |
| Team épée | Kazakhstan | Iran | South Korea |
| Individual foil | Zhu Jun; China | Nontapat Panchan; Thailand | Cha Hyung-woo; South Korea |
| Individual foil | Zhu Jun; China | Nontapat Panchan; Thailand | Toru Yamaguchi; Japan |
| Team foil | China | Japan | Hong Kong |
| Team foil | China | Japan | South Korea |
| Individual sabre | Zhong Man; China | Cai Lin; China | Mojtaba Abedini; Iran |
| Individual sabre | Zhong Man; China | Cai Lin; China | Peyman Fakhri; Iran |
| Team sabre | China | South Korea | Iran |
| Team sabre | China | South Korea | Kazakhstan |

=== Women ===
| Event | Gold | Silver | Bronze |
|---|---|---|---|
| Individual épée | Tan Li; China | Megumi Harada; Japan | Sabrina Lui; Hong Kong |
| Individual épée | Tan Li; China | Megumi Harada; Japan | Zhang Jiangqing; China |
| Team épée | China | South Korea | Hong Kong |
| Team épée | China | South Korea | Kazakhstan |
| Individual foil | Su Wanwen; China | Ma Na; China | Kim Na-rae; South Korea |
| Individual foil | Su Wanwen; China | Ma Na; China | Liu Yuan; China |
| Team foil | China | South Korea | Hong Kong |
| Team foil | China | South Korea | Japan |
| Individual sabre | Zhao Yuanyuan; China | Kim Young-ju; South Korea | Madoka Hisagae; Japan |
| Individual sabre | Zhao Yuanyuan; China | Kim Young-ju; South Korea | Sakura Kaneko; Japan |
| Team sabre | China | Japan | Hong Kong |
| Team sabre | China | Japan | South Korea |

== Medal table ==
| Rank | Nation | Gold | Silver | Bronze | Total |
|---|---|---|---|---|---|
| 1 | China | 10 | 2 | 3 | 15 |
| 2 | South Korea | 1 | 4 | 5 | 10 |
| 3 | Kazakhstan | 1 | 1 | 3 | 5 |
| 4 | Japan | 0 | 3 | 5 | 8 |
| 5 | Iran | 0 | 1 | 3 | 4 |
| 6 | Thailand | 0 | 1 | 0 | 1 |
| 7 | Hong Kong | 0 | 0 | 5 | 5 |
| Totals (7 entries) | | 12 | 12 | 24 | 48 |
