= Kim Sang-min =

South Korean footballer

Personal information
- Date of birth: 23 May 1989 (age 37)
- Place of birth: South Korea
- Height: 1.90 m (6 ft 3 in)
- Position: Defender

Senior career*
Years	Team	Apps	(Gls)
2013–2014	Nagaworld	23	(0)
2014–2016	Ceres Negros	42	(7)
2017–2018	Minerva Punjab	3	(0)
2018	PS TIRA	16	(1)
Korean name
Hangul	김상민
RR	Gim Sangmin
MR	Kim Sangmin
- * Club domestic league appearances and goals as of 22 July 2018

Kim Sang-min (born 23 May 1989) is a South Korean professional footballer who plays as a central defender.

== Career ==
=== Early years ===
Kim played for Nagacorp FC and Ceres, where he won United Football League in 2015.

=== Minerva Punjab ===
Kim played his first game in India playing for Minerva Punjab in the I-League against Bengaluru FC, which Minerva Punjab lost by a solitary goal.

== Honors ==
Ceres

- United Football League: 2015; runner-up: 2016
- UFL Cup runner-up: 2016
