= Zhong Man =

Chinese fencer

Medal record

Representing China

Men's Fencing

Olympic Games
Gold medal – first place	2008 Beijing	Sabre Individual

Asian Games
Gold medal – first place	2010 Guangzhou	Team
Silver medal – second place	2010 Guangzhou	Individual

Asian Championships
Gold medal – first place	2007 Nantong	Team
Gold medal – first place	2008 Bangkok	Individual
Gold medal – first place	2008 Bangkok	Team
Gold medal – first place	2009 Doha	Team
Gold medal – first place	2010 Seoul	Team
Gold medal – first place	2012 Wakayama	Team
Silver medal – second place	2007 Nantong	Individual
Silver medal – second place	2011 Seoul	Team
Bronze medal – third place	2009 Doha	Individual
Bronze medal – third place	2012 Wakayama	Individual

Universiade
Gold medal – first place	2009 Belgrade	Team
Bronze medal – third place	2009 Belgrade	Individual

Zhong Man (simplified Chinese: 仲满; traditional Chinese: 仲滿; pinyin: Zhòng Mǎn, born February 28, 1983, in Nantong, Jiangsu) is a Chinese sabre fencer, who competed at the 2008 Summer Olympics, winning the second ever gold medal for China in fencing. During the 07/08 season, he was ranked number 2 in the world.

== See also ==
- China at the 2008 Summer Olympics
