= Won Woo-young =

South Korean fencer

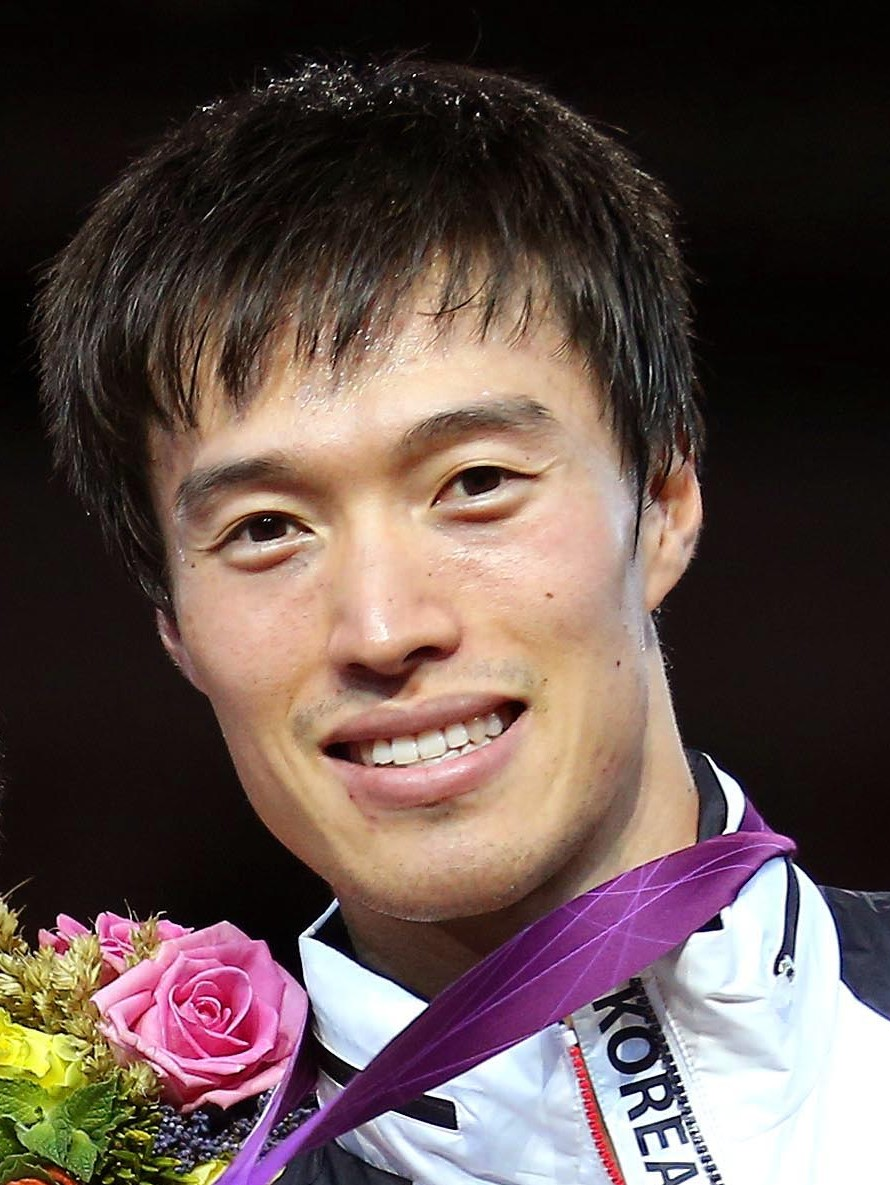
- Won at the 2012 Summer Olympics

Personal information
- Born: 3 February 1982 (age 44) Seoul, South Korea
- Height: 182 cm (6 ft 0 in)

Fencing career
- Sport: Fencing
- Country: South Korea
- Weapon: Sabre
- Hand: Right-handed
- Years on national team: 2004–2015
- Highest ranking: 5 (2010-2011)
Medal record
Event	1st	2nd	3rd
Olympic Games	1	0	0
Asian Games	1	2	0
World Championships	1	1	1
Asian Championships	4	4	1
Olympic Games
Gold medal – first place	2012 London	Team
World Championships
Gold medal – first place	2010 Paris	Individual
Silver medal – second place	2014 Kazan	Team
Bronze medal – third place	2006 Turin	Individual
Asian Games
Gold medal – first place	2014 Incheon	Team
Silver medal – second place	2006 Doha	Team
Silver medal – second place	2010 Guangzhou	Team
Asian Championships
Gold medal – first place	2011 Seoul	Individual
Gold medal – first place	2011 Seoul	Team
Gold medal – first place	2014 Suwon	Team
Gold medal – first place	2015 Singapore	Team
Silver medal – second place	2007 Nantong	Team
Silver medal – second place	2010 Seoul	Team
Silver medal – second place	2012 Wakayama	Team
Silver medal – second place	2012 Wakayama	Individual
Bronze medal – third place	2015 Singapore	Individual

- Won Woo-young
- Hangul: 원우영
- Hanja: 元禹寧
- RR: Won Uyeong
- MR: Wŏn Uyŏng

Won Woo-young (Korean: 원우영; Korean pronunciation: [wʌn.u.jʌŋ]; born 3 February 1982) is a South Korean sabre fencer. He won gold at the Olympics, World Championships, Asian Games and Asian Championships and is the first Asian fencer to win gold in the men's individual sabre event at the World Championships.

After retiring, he became a sports commentator for Seoul Broadcasting System and covered fencing events at various international tournaments. In November 2021, he was appointed coach of the men's sabre team.

== Early life ==
Won attended Hongik University High School, then one of the few schools in Seoul with a fencing team, and was a year ahead of future sabre teammate Kim Jung-hwan. One of their seniors was foil fencer and future Olympic silver medalist Choi Byung-chul. He graduated from Korea National Sport University in 2004.

== Career ==
Won began competing internationally in 2004 and won the bronze medal at the sabre 2006 World Fencing Championships, after losing 15–10 to Zsolt Nemcsik in the semi-final. At the sabre 2010 World Fencing Championships, he won the gold medal, beating then-world number 1 Nicolas Limbach 15–9 in the final. It was the first time an Asian fencer had won the gold medal at a sabre event in the World Championships.

Won, together with Oh Eun-seok, Kim Jung-hwan and Gu Bon-gil, were selected for the national team to compete at the 2012 Summer Olympics The Olympics began on a sour note for them as he, Kim and Gu all did not make it past the semi-final stage of the individual event; he lost in the last 16 to Nikolay Kovalev, the eventual bronze medallist. They managed to win a historic gold in the team event, South Korea's first ever Olympic gold medal in the men's team sabre category. The quartet continued to dominate in the team events; in the year 2014 alone they swept gold at both the Asian Championships and Asian Games hosted at home and won silver at the World Championships. They had a disappointing run at the 2015 World Championships as none of them reached the final in the individual event and then lost by only a point to France in the quarter-finals of the team event. A week later, they successfully defended their team gold medal at the Asian Championships, his last major international competition. He and Oh both retired from the national team at the end of the season.

In 2016 Won was awarded the Order of Sports Merit Cheongnyong (청룡장; English: Blue Dragon) class, the South Korean government's highest honor bestowed on professional athletes who meet the criteria.

=== Medal Record ===
==== Olympic Games ====
Year	Location	Event	Position
2012	London, United Kingdom	Team Men's Sabre	1st

==== World Championships ====
Year	Location	Event	Position
2006	Turin, Italy	Individual Men's Sabre	3rd
2010	Paris, France	Individual Men's Sabre	1st
2014	Kazan, Russia	Team Men's Sabre	2nd

==== World Cup ====
Year	Location	Event	Position
6/25/2005	Sofia, Bulgaria	Individual Men's Sabre	2nd
6/18/2010	New York City, United States	Individual Men's Sabre	3rd
5/13/2011	Madrid, Spain	Individual Men's Sabre	3rd
4/27/2012	Athens, Greece	Individual Men's Sabre	3rd

==== Grand Prix ====
Year	Location	Event	Position
2/29/2008	Plovdiv, Bulgaria	Individual Men's Sabre	3rd
6/4/2011	Warsaw, Poland	Individual Men's Sabre	2nd
3/3/2012	Budapest, Hungary	Individual Men's Sabre	3rd

== Post-retirement ==
Won retired from the national team in 2015 but continued to play amateurly and coach at his club. He also became a commentator for SBS and covered fencing events at the 2016 and 2020 Summer Olympics and the 2018 Asian Games.

In November 2021, ahead of the Orleans Grand Prix, the Korean Fencing Federation announced that Won had been appointed coach of the men's sabre team.

== Personal life ==
Won married his girlfriend of three years, a flight attendant, in September 2015.
