= 2005 Asian Fencing Championships =

- Host city: Kota Kinabalu, Malaysia
- Dates: 25–30 July 2005
- Main venue: Likas Sports Complex

The 2005 Asian Fencing Championships was held at the Likas Sports Complex, Kota Kinabalu, Sabah, Malaysia from 25 July to 30 July 2005.

== Medal summary ==
=== Men ===
Event	Gold	Silver	Bronze
Individual épée	Sergey Shabalin; Kazakhstan	Nicola Lu; Hong Kong	Alexandr Axenov; Kazakhstan
Individual épée	Sergey Shabalin; Kazakhstan	Nicola Lu; Hong Kong	Keisuke Sakamoto; Japan
Team épée	Kazakhstan	Iran	Japan
Team épée	Kazakhstan	Iran	South Korea
Individual foil	Zhu Jun; China	Daisuke Saito; Japan	Lee Kwan-haeng; South Korea
Individual foil	Zhu Jun; China	Daisuke Saito; Japan	Javad Rezaei; Iran
Team foil	China	Japan	South Korea
Team foil	China	Japan	Uzbekistan
Individual sabre	Zhou Hanming; China	Hwang Byung-yul; South Korea	Mojtaba Abedini; Iran
Individual sabre	Zhou Hanming; China	Hwang Byung-yul; South Korea	Igor Tsel; Kazakhstan
Team sabre	South Korea	China	Hong Kong
Team sabre	South Korea	China	Iran

=== Women ===
Event	Gold	Silver	Bronze
Individual épée	Luo Xiaojuan; China	Qin Lanlan; China	Kim Ju-ha; South Korea
Individual épée	Luo Xiaojuan; China	Qin Lanlan; China	Shen Weiwei; China
Team épée	China	South Korea	Hong Kong
Team épée	China	South Korea	Japan
Individual foil	Chang Mi-kyung; South Korea	Zhang Lei; China	Qui Yilin; China
Individual foil	Chang Mi-kyung; South Korea	Zhang Lei; China	Kaori Zanma; Japan
Team foil	China	Japan	Kazakhstan
Team foil	China	Japan	South Korea
Individual sabre	Zhao Yuanyuan; China	Bao Yingying; China	Huang Haiyang; China
Individual sabre	Zhao Yuanyuan; China	Bao Yingying; China	Zhao Xue; China
Team sabre	China	Hong Kong	South Korea
Team sabre	China	Hong Kong	Vietnam

== Medal table ==
Rank	Nation	Gold	Silver	Bronze	Total
1	China	8	4	4	16
2	South Korea	2	2	6	10
3	Kazakhstan	2	0	3	5
4	Japan	0	3	4	7
5	Hong Kong	0	2	2	4
6	Iran	0	1	3	4
7	Uzbekistan	0	0	1	1
7	Vietnam	0	0	1	1
Totals (8 entries)		12	12	24	48
