= Kenta Chida =

Japanese fencer (born 1985)

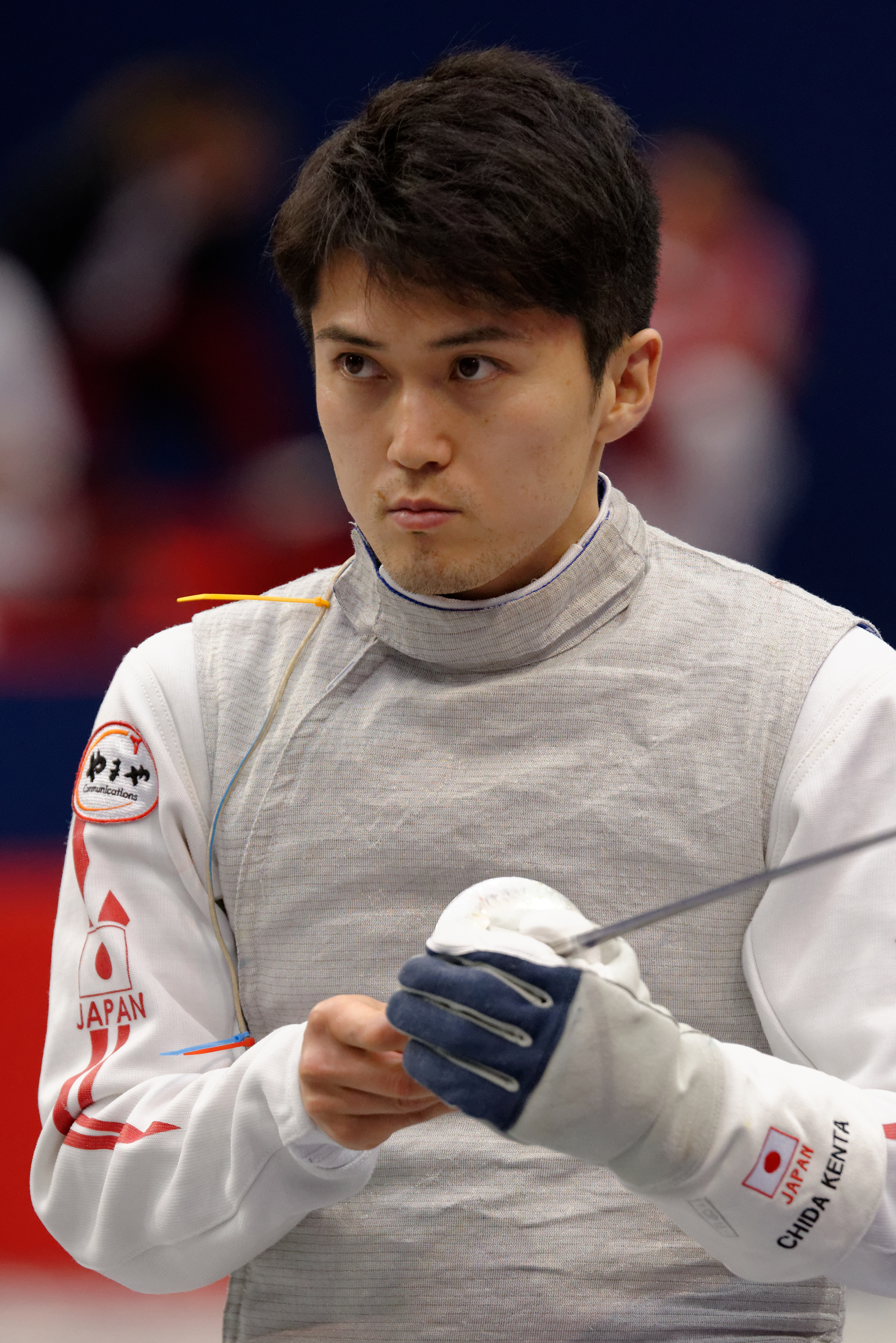

Personal information
- Born: 22 August 1985 (age 41) Kesennuma, Miyagi, Japan
- Height: 1.7 m (5 ft 7 in)
- Weight: 65 kg (143 lb)

Fencing career
- Sport: Fencing
- Country: Japan
- Weapon: foil
- Hand: left-handed
- National coach: Oleg Matseichuk
- Club: Nexus Fencing Team
- FIE ranking: current ranking
Medal record
Olympic Games
Silver medal – second place	2012 London	Team
World Championships
Bronze medal – third place	2010 Paris	Team
Asian Fencing Championships
Silver medal – second place	2011 Seoul	Individual
Silver medal – second place	2005 Kota Kinabalu	Team
Bronze medal – third place	2014 Suwon	Individual

Kenta Chida (千田健太, Chida Kenta; born 2 August 1985) is a Japanese fencer. At the 2012 Summer Olympics he competed in the men's foil, but was defeated in the second round. He won a silver medal in the team foil event.

== Career ==
Chida's father Kenichi was selected for the 1980 Summer Olympics in Moscow, but he could not attend the event due to Japan's boycott of the Games. He however made no attempt to push his son into fencing; Kenta chose the sport for himself during his first year at junior high school. He was originally right handed, but his father suggested that he switch to fencing with his left hand to gain a competitive advantage.

Chida began fencing in the senior category in the 2002–03 season, then joined the national team and began training under national coach Oleg Matseichuk. Chida made his breakthrough in 2006–07 season: he climbed his first World Cup podium with a bronze medal in the Tokyo World Cup, followed by another bronze in the Cairo Grand Prix. These results allowed him to enter the Top 20.

At the 2008 Summer Olympics, he competed in the men's individual foil, finishing 11th, losing to Benjamin Kleibrink, the eventual champion, in the second round.

Chida graduated in 2009 from the Faculty of Letters of Chuo University.
