= Amber Parkinson =

Australian fencer

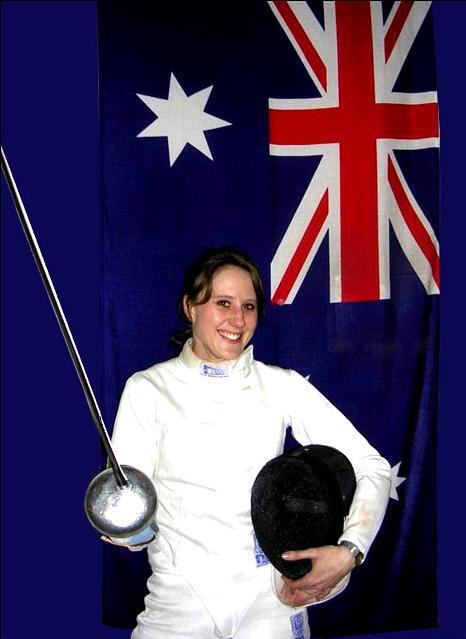
Amber Parkinson

Amber Parkinson (born 3 October 1976 in Melbourne) is an Australian épée fencer.

== As an Athlete ==
Parkinson was ranked first in the Australian Open Fencing Championships in December 2007. In August 2007 Parkinson competed in the Asian Fencing Championships Nantong, China, coming second. Parkinson also competed at several fencing tournaments in Europe for 10 weeks in early 2008 resulting in her qualifying for the Australian Olympic Fencing Team for Beijing 2008. In April 2008 Parkinson came third in the Asian Fencing Championships.

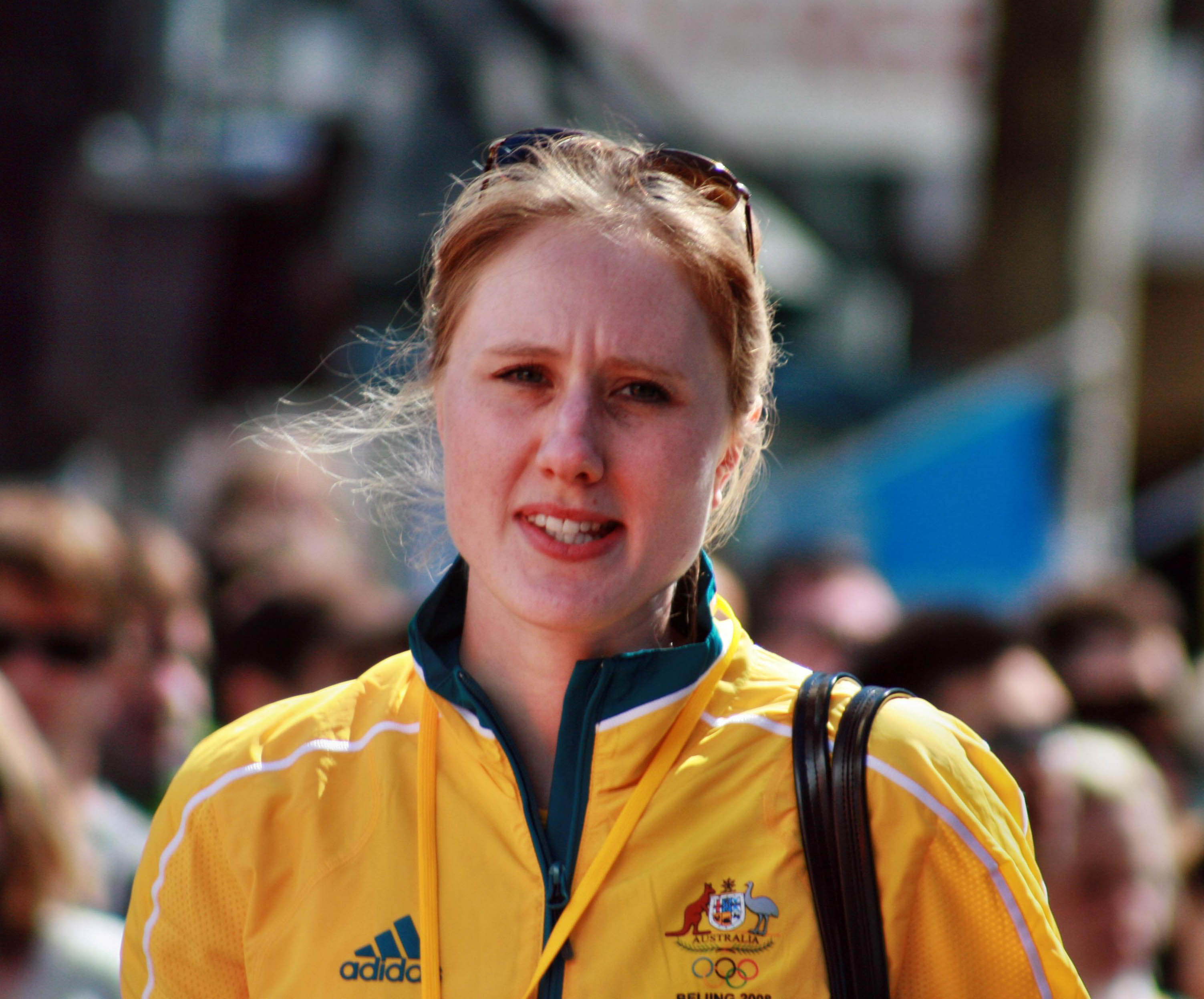
Parkinson at the Olympic Homecoming parade in Melbourne.

== Achievements ==
- Australian Open Fencing Championships December 2007, Gold
- Asian Fencing Championships, Nantong, China, August 2007, Silver
- Asian Fencing championships, Bangkok, Thailand, April 2008, Bronze
- Germany Fencing Championships Berlin, June 2000 Gold
