= Shin A-lam =

South Korean épée fencer

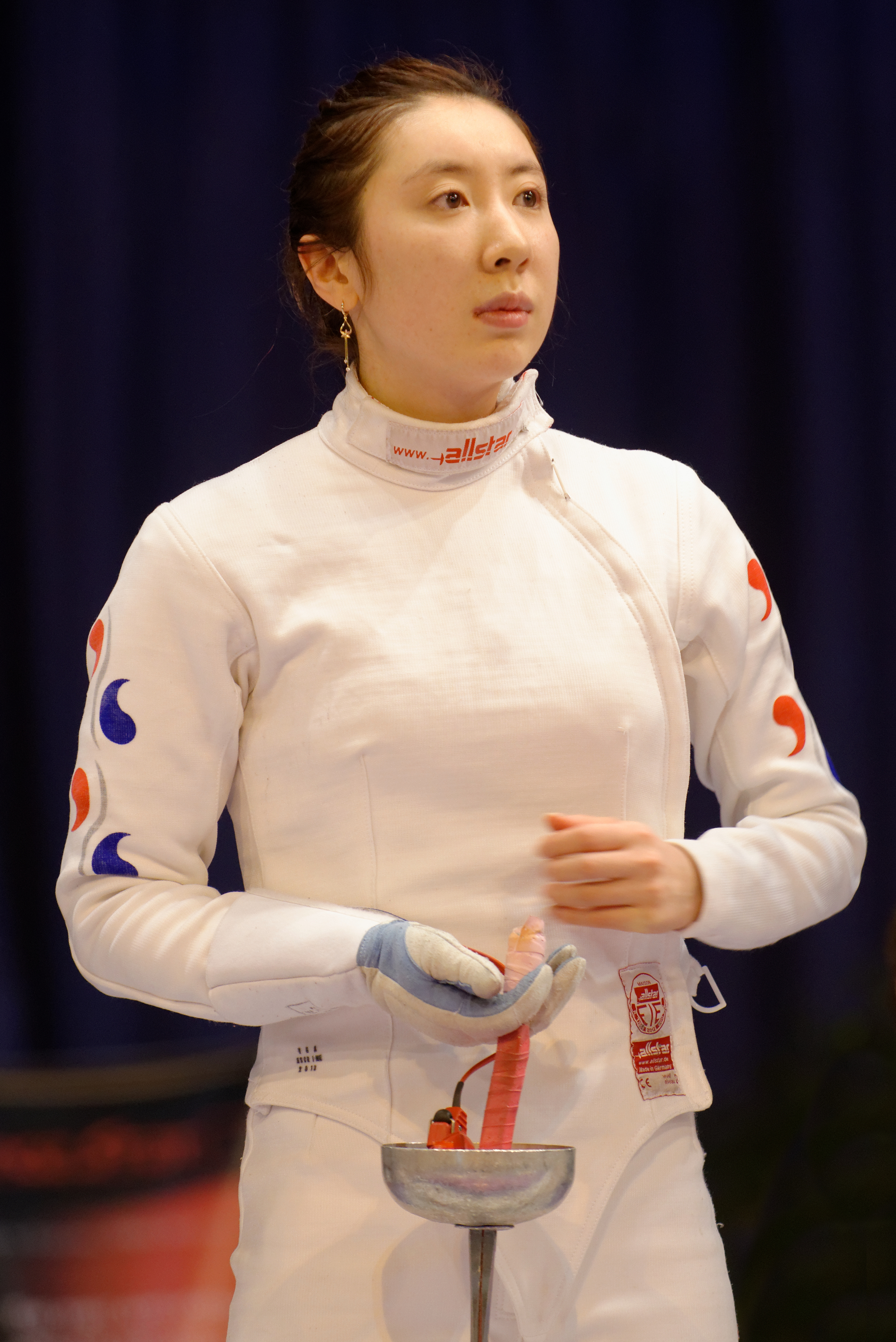
- Shin at the Challenge International de Saint-Maur 2013

Personal information
- Native name: 신아람
- Nationality: South Korean
- Born: 23 September 1986 (age 39) Geumsan, South Korea

Sport
- Country: South Korea
- Sport: Fencing
- Event: Épée

Achievements and titles
- Olympic finals: Silver (Team épée, 2012); 4th (Épée, 2012)
Medal record
Women's fencing
Representing South Korea
Olympic Games
Silver medal – second place	2012 London	Team
World Championships
Silver medal – second place	2018 Wuxi	Team
Bronze medal – third place	2010 Paris	Team
Asian Games
Silver medal – second place	2006 Doha	Team
Silver medal – second place	2014 Incheon	Individual
Silver medal – second place	2014 Incheon	Team
Bronze medal – third place	2006 Doha	Individual
Bronze medal – third place	2010 Guangzhou	Team
Asian Championships
Gold medal – first place	2012 Wakayama	Individual
Gold medal – first place	2015 Singapore	Team
Gold medal – first place	2016 Wuxi	Team
Silver medal – second place	2012 Wakayama	Team
Silver medal – second place	2013 Shanghai	Team
Silver medal – second place	2014 Suwon	Individual
Silver medal – second place	2014 Suwon	Team
Bronze medal – third place	2016 Wuxi	Individual
Universiade
Gold medal – first place	2013 Kazan	Individual
Silver medal – second place	2013 Kazan	Team
Bronze medal – third place	2011 Shenzhen	Individual

Shin A-lam (Korean: 신아람, Korean pronunciation: [ɕi.na.ɾam] or [ɕin] [a.ɾam]; born 23 September 1986) is a South Korean épée fencer.

== Education ==
- 2005–2009, Korea National Sport University.
- 2002–2005 Girls High School, Geumsan, South Korea.

== Career ==
- 2006 Doha Asian Games - Women's National Fencing Team
- 2010 Guangzhou Asian Games - Women's National Fencing Team
- 2011 Shenzhen - Women's National Fencing Team
- 2012 London Olympics - Women's national fencing Team
- 2016 Rio de Janeiro Olympics - Women's national fencing Team

== 2012 Summer Olympics ==
Shin competed at the 2012 Summer Olympics in the Women's épée in both the individual and team event. In the semifinals of the women's individual épée, she lost to German Britta Heidemann after a timekeeping error extended bout time. The situation arose at the end of the one-minute overtime (sudden death) with the match tied 5-5. Without the extension, Shin would have won the tied bout on the basis of priority, which is randomly awarded to one fencer prior to the overtime period.

With one whole second showing on the official clock, Heidemann made two rapid attacks in succession, both halted by double-touches. The clock in the arena continued to show "00:01", because it could not display decimal fractions of a second. The referee then called "halt" to the bout. At this point, the timekeeper (a Games volunteer) restarted the clock, inadvertently expiring all the remaining time, reportedly 0.02 seconds. This action caused the arena clock to show "00:00", giving Shin reason to celebrate. However, the error was noted and since an overtime minute had to be fenced in its entirety, the referee applied FIE rule t.32.3, which states that in the event of a failure of the clock or an error by the timekeeper, the referee must estimate how much time is left. The timekeeper, with the referee's permission, reset the clock to show "00:01", one whole second being the minimum unit of time possible. Following the resumption of the bout, Heidemann scored a single touch just as the full second expired. The result was partly due to the failure of the referee to stop both fencers from restarting closer than the specified distance, Heidemann's "crowding" to hurry her attack, and Shin trying to avoid retreating across her end line.

The South Koreans immediately appealed the decision, stating that 0.02s had already elapsed and the final touch occurred after the end of the bout. In accordance with fencing bylaws, Shin could not leave the piste while the officials deliberated the situation. Sobbing profusely, she sat alone for over an hour awaiting their decision. Ultimately, the judges gave the victory to Heidemann.

An hour later, Shin returned for the bronze medal match but lost to her Chinese opponent despite loud encouragement from the cheering crowd.

Later, the International Fencing Federation offered her a "special medal" after her semi-final defeat. She rejected the offer, saying "It does not make me feel better because it's not an Olympic medal. I don't accept the result because I believe it was a mistake."

Shin won a silver medal in the women's team épée competition five days later.

== Television appearances ==
- 2020: King of Masked Singer (MBC), contestant as "Cherry Spirit" (episode 263)

== See also ==
- Controversies at the 2012 Summer Olympics
