= Kyomi Hirata =

Japanese fencer

Personal information
- Born: 22 July 1982 (age 43)
- Height: 1.65 m (5 ft 5 in)
- Weight: 58 kg (128 lb; 9.1 st)

Fencing career
- Sport: Fencing
- Country: Japan
- Weapon: Foil
- Hand: Right-handed
- FIE ranking: current ranking

Kyomi Hirata (born 22 July 1982) is a Japanese foil fencer. She competed in the women's team foil competition at the 2012 Summer Olympics.
