= Liu Xiao (fencer) =

Chinese fencer (born 1987)

Liu Xiao (born 8 November 1987, Anshan) is a Chinese fencer. At the 2012 Summer Olympics, he competed in the Men's sabre, but was defeated in the second round.
