= 2009 Asian Fencing Championships =

- Host city: Doha, Qatar
- Dates: 14–19 November 2009
- Main venue: Aspire Dome

The 2009 Asian Fencing Championships was held in Doha, Qatar from 14 November to 19 November 2009.

== Medal summary ==
=== Men ===
Event	Gold	Silver	Bronze
Individual épée	Park Kyoung-doo; South Korea	Jung Seung-hwa; South Korea	An Sung-ho; South Korea
Individual épée	Park Kyoung-doo; South Korea	Jung Seung-hwa; South Korea	Wang Feng; China
Team épée	South Korea	Kazakhstan	China
Team épée	South Korea	Kazakhstan	Japan
Individual foil	Yuki Ota; Japan	Zhu Jun; China	Kwon Young-ho; South Korea
Individual foil	Yuki Ota; Japan	Zhu Jun; China	Ha Tae-gyu; South Korea
Team foil	Japan	China	South Korea
Team foil	Japan	China	Hong Kong
Individual sabre	Kim Jung-hwan; South Korea	Oh Eun-seok; South Korea	Zhong Man; China
Individual sabre	Kim Jung-hwan; South Korea	Oh Eun-seok; South Korea	Koji Yamamoto; Japan
Team sabre	China	Japan	South Korea
Team sabre	China	Japan	Kazakhstan

=== Women ===
Event	Gold	Silver	Bronze
Individual épée	Luo Xiaojuan; China	Xu Anqi; China	Jung Hyo-jung; South Korea
Individual épée	Luo Xiaojuan; China	Xu Anqi; China	Oh Yun-hee; South Korea
Team épée	South Korea	China	Hong Kong
Team épée	South Korea	China	Japan
Individual foil	Nam Hyun-hee; South Korea	Dai Huili; China	Jeon Hee-sook; South Korea
Individual foil	Nam Hyun-hee; South Korea	Dai Huili; China	Yuki Mori; Japan
Team foil	South Korea	China	Japan
Team foil	South Korea	China	Hong Kong
Individual sabre	Ni Hong; China	Chow Tsz Ki; Hong Kong	Zhu Min; China
Individual sabre	Ni Hong; China	Chow Tsz Ki; Hong Kong	Kim Keum-hwa; South Korea
Team sabre	China	South Korea	Hong Kong
Team sabre	China	South Korea	Japan

== Medal table ==
Rank	Nation	Gold	Silver	Bronze	Total
1	South Korea	6	3	9	18
2	China	4	6	4	14
3	Japan	2	1	6	9
4	Hong Kong	0	1	4	5
5	Kazakhstan	0	1	1	2
Totals (5 entries)		12	12	24	48
