= Zhou Hanming =

Chinese fencer (born 1980)

Personal information
- Born: 18 October 1980 (age 45) Guangzhou, Guangdong

Sport
- Sport: Fencing

Zhou Hanming (born 18 October 1980, in Guangzhou, Guangdong) is a Chinese Sabre fencer, who competed at the 2004 and 2008 Summer Olympics.

== Major performances ==
- 2004 World Cup France - 2nd team;
- 2004 Olympic Games - 7th team

== See also ==
- China at the 2008 Summer Olympics
