= Huang Haiyang =

Chinese fencer

Personal information
- Born: 1985 (age 40–41)
Medal record
Women's Fencing
Olympic Games
Silver medal – second place	2008 Beijing	Team sabre

Huang Haiyang (simplified Chinese: 黄海洋; traditional Chinese: 黃海洋; pinyin: Huáng Hǎiyáng; born 1985-11-01 in Xuzhou, Jiangsu) is a female Chinese sabre fencer. She competed at the 2008 Summer Olympics.

== Major performances ==
- 2002 Asian Games - 1st team;
- 2003 World Championships - 2nd team;
- 2004 World Cup Grand Prix - 2nd team

== See also ==
- China at the 2008 Summer Olympics
