= Jiang Kelü =

Chinese fencer

Personal information
- Born: 29 April 1985 (age 41) Wuxi, Jiangsu province, China
- Height: 1.77 m (5 ft 9 1/2 in)
- Weight: 76 kg (168 lb; 12.0 st)

Fencing career
- Sport: Fencing
- Country: China
- Weapon: Sabre
- Hand: Right-handed
- FIE ranking: current ranking

Jiang Kelü (Chinese: 蒋科律; pinyin: Jiǎng Kēlǜ; born 29 April 1985) is a Chinese sabre fencer. He competed in the men's team sabre competition at the 2012 Summer Olympics. He is married to fellow Jiangsu fencer Zhu Min.
