= Seira Nakayama =

Japanese fencer (born 1983)

Personal information
- Nationality: Japan
- Born: 22 November 1983 (age 42) Kōnan, Aichi, Japan
- Height: 1.71 m (5 ft 7 1/2 in)
- Weight: 63 kg (139 lb)

Sport
- Sport: Fencing
- Event: Sabre
- Club: Ogaki Kyoritsu Bank
- Coached by: Volodymyr Lukashenko

Seira Nakayama (中山 セイラ, Nakayama Seira; born November 22, 1983 in Kōnan, Aichi) is a Japanese sabre fencer. Nakayama is also a member of the fencing team for Ogaki Kyoritsu Bank Sporting Club in Gifu, and is coached and trained by two-time Olympian Volodymyr Lukashenko of Ukraine.

Nakayama represented Japan at the 2012 Summer Olympics in London, where she competed in the women's individual sabre event. She defeated France's Léonore Perrus in the first preliminary round, before losing her next match to U.S. fencer and two-time Olympic champion Mariel Zagunis, with a final score of 9–15.
