= Xu Anqi =

Chinese fencer (born 1992)

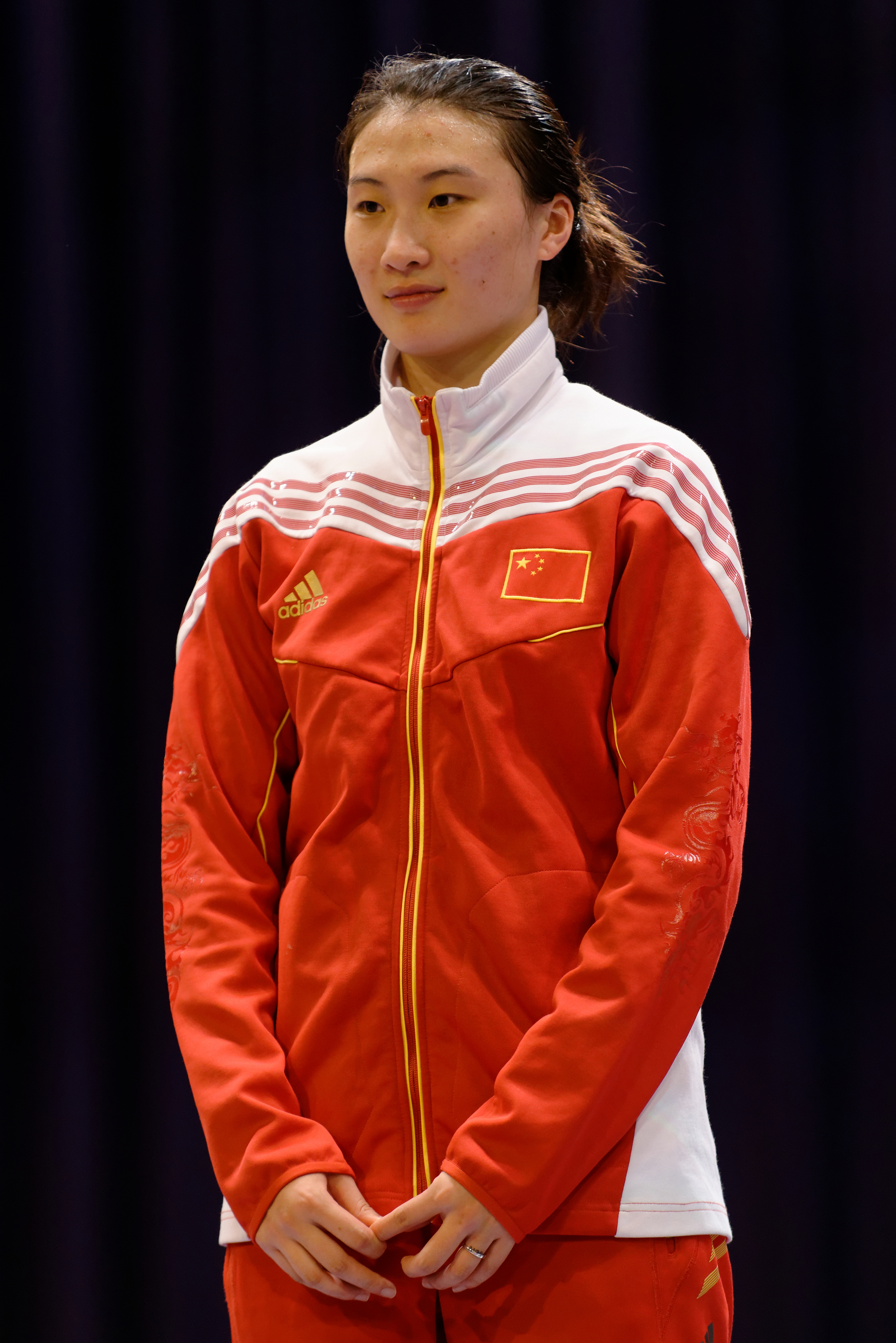
- Xu at the 2014 Challenge International de Saint-Maur

Personal information
- Born: 23 January 1992 (age 34) Nanjing, China
- Height: 1.83 m (6 ft 0 in)
- Weight: 75 kg (165 lb)

Fencing career
- Sport: Fencing
- Country: China
- Weapon: Épée
- Hand: right-handed
- National coach: Xu Xuening
- FIE ranking: current ranking
Medal record
Olympic Games
Gold medal – first place	2012 London	Team
Silver medal – second place	2016 Rio de Janeiro	Team
World Championships
Gold medal – first place	2015 Moscow	Team
Gold medal – first place	2019 Budapest	Team
Silver medal – second place	2013 Budapest	Team
Bronze medal – third place	2015 Moscow	Individual

Xu Anqi (Chinese: 许安琪; pinyin: Xǔ Ānqí; born 23 January 1992) is a Chinese right-handed épée fencer.

Xu is a two-time individual Asian champion, four-time team Asian champion, and two-time team world champion.

A three-time Olympian, Xu is a 2016 team Olympic silver medalist and the 2012 team Olympic champion.

Xu competed in the 2012 London Olympic Games, the 2016 Rio de Janeiro Olympic Games, and the 2020 Tokyo Olympic Games.

== Medal Record ==
=== Olympic Games ===
Year	Location	Event	Position
2012	London, United Kingdom	Team Women's Épée	1st
2016	Rio de Janeiro, Brazil	Team Women's Épée	2nd

=== World Championship ===
Year	Location	Event	Position
2011	Catania, Italy	Team Women's Épée	2nd
2013	Budapest, Hungary	Team Women's Épée	2nd
2015	Moscow, Russia	Individual Women's Épée	3rd
2015	Moscow, Russia	Team Women's Épée	1st
2019	Budapest, Hungary	Team Women's Épée	1st

=== Asian Championship ===
Year	Location	Event	Position
2010	Seoul, South Korea	Team Women's Épée	1st
2011	Seoul, South Korea	Team Women's Épée	1st
2012	Wakayama, Japan	Individual Women's Épée	3rd
2012	Wakayama, Japan	Team Women's Épée	1st
2013	Shanghai, China	Individual Women's Épée	1st
2013	Shanghai, China	Team Women's Épée	1st
2015	Singapore	Individual Women's Épée	1st
2015	Singapore	Team Women's Épée	2nd
2016	Wuxi, China	Individual Women's Épée	2nd
2016	Wuxi, China	Team Women's Épée	2nd

=== Grand Prix ===
Date	Location	Event	Position
04/26/2014	Xuzhou, China	Individual Women's Épée	2nd
03/18/2016	Budapest, Hungary	Individual Women's Épée	1st
04/22/2016	Rio de Janeiro, Brazil	Individual Women's Épée	2nd

=== World Cup ===
Date	Location	Event	Position
01/19/2013	Doha, Qatar	Individual Women's Épée	1st
02/28/2014	Saint-Maur-des-Fossés, France	Individual Women's Épée	1st
01/23/2015	Barcelona, Spain	Individual Women's Épée	1st
