= Shogo Nishida =

Japanese fencer

Personal information
- Nationality: Japan
- Born: 27 November 1982 Kagoshima, Japan
- Height: 5 ft 8 in (172 cm)
- Weight: 143 lb (65 kg)
Medal record
Men's Fencing - Epée
Representing Japan
Men's Fencing
Asian Games
Bronze medal – third place	2010 Guangzhou	Individual
Bronze medal – third place	2010 Guangzhou	Team

Shogo Nishida (西田 祥吾, Nishida Shōgo; born 27 November 1982) is a Japanese fencer. He competed at the 2008 Summer Olympics, but was eliminated in the first round by Paris Inostroza.
