= List of Asian Games medalists in fencing =

This is the complete list of Asian Games medalists in fencing from 1974 to 2022.

== Men ==
=== Individual épée ===
Games	Gold	Silver	Bronze
1974 Tehran	Makoto Ishikawa (JPN)	Pirouz Adamiat (IRN)	Mitsuyasu Aida (JPN)
1978 Bangkok	Toshiaki Araki (JPN)	Kim Kuk-hyun (KOR)	Sei Murata (JPN)
1986 Seoul	Lee Il-hee (KOR)	Ma Zhi (CHN)	Kim Bong-man (KOR)
1990 Beijing	Yang Dal-sik (KOR)	Chang Tae-suk (KOR)	Lee Sang-ki (KOR)
1994 Hiroshima	Xu Xuening (CHN)	Alexey Pistsov (KAZ)	Sergey Shabalin (KAZ)
1998 Bangkok	Yang Roy-sung (KOR)	Lee Sang-ki (KOR)	Zhao Gang (CHN)
2002 Busan	Zhao Gang (CHN)	Wang Lei (CHN)	Sergey Shabalin (KAZ)
2006 Doha	Wang Lei (CHN)	Xie Yongjun (CHN)	Ali Yaghoubian (IRI)
2006 Doha	Wang Lei (CHN)	Xie Yongjun (CHN)	Kim Seung-gu (KOR)
2010 Guangzhou	Kim Won-jin (KOR)	Li Guojie (CHN)	Yin Lianchi (CHN)
2010 Guangzhou	Kim Won-jin (KOR)	Li Guojie (CHN)	Shogo Nishida (JPN)
2014 Incheon	Jung Jin-sun (KOR)	Park Kyoung-doo (KOR)	Lim Wei Wen (SIN)
2014 Incheon	Jung Jin-sun (KOR)	Park Kyoung-doo (KOR)	Nguyễn Tiến Nhật (VIE)
2018 Jakarta–Palembang	Dmitriy Alexanin (KAZ)	Park Sang-young (KOR)	Koki Kano (JPN)
2018 Jakarta–Palembang	Dmitriy Alexanin (KAZ)	Park Sang-young (KOR)	Jung Jin-sun (KOR)
2022 Hangzhou	Koki Kano (JPN)	Akira Komata (JPN)	Ho Wai Hang (HKG)
2022 Hangzhou	Koki Kano (JPN)	Akira Komata (JPN)	Elmir Alimzhanov (KAZ)

=== Team épée ===
Games	Gold	Silver	Bronze
1974 Tehran	Iran (IRN); Pirouz Adamiat; Parviz Almasi; Sarkis Assadourian; Ali Asghar Pashapour; Esfandiar Zarnegar	Japan (JPN)	China (CHN); Gao Weilin; Guo Yineng; Tao Jinhan; Tong Wei
1978 Bangkok	China (CHN); Cui Yining; Guo Dongsheng; He Zhiping; Tan Zhihui	Japan (JPN); Toshiaki Araki; Hideyuki Itakura; Sei Murata; Takahiro Yamaguchi	South Korea (KOR); Kim Heon-su; Kim Kuk-hyun; Kook Choong-kum; Shin Dong-seok
1986 Seoul	South Korea (KOR); Choi Jeung-sik; Kim Bong-man; Lee Il-hee; Lee Sang-ki; Yoon Nam-jin	China (CHN); Huang Zhen; Kang Yan; Ma Zhi; Yao Yong; Zong Xiangqing	Japan (JPN); Hironao Nagai; Masahiro Sato; Toshihiko Sugawara; Keiju Suzuki
1990 Beijing	South Korea (KOR); Chang Tae-suk; Cho Hee-jae; Lee Sang-ki; Yang Dal-sik; Yoon Nam-jin	China (CHN); Du Zhencheng; Ma Zhi; Wang Qun; Xu Xuening; Yang Wenyong	Japan (JPN); Masatoshi Mino; Kosei Murakami; Tetsuhisa Murakami; Hitoshi Nishigaki; Masahiro Sato
1994 Hiroshima	Kazakhstan (KAZ); Dmitriy Dimov; Andrey Mazanov; Alexey Pistsov; Sergey Shabalin; Yuriy Tsvetov	China (CHN); Du Zhencheng; Xu Xuening; Xu Zhongzhu; Ye Chong; Zhao Gang	South Korea (KOR); Ku Kyo-dong; Lee Sang-ki; Lee Sang-yup; Park Choon-koan; Yoon Won-jin
1998 Bangkok	South Korea (KOR); Choi Yong-chul; Lee Sang-ki; Lee Sang-yup; Yang Roy-sung	Kazakhstan (KAZ); Alexandr Axenov; Dmitriy Dimov; Alexey Pistsov; Sergey Shabalin	China (CHN); Dong Zhaozhi; Wang Qibing; Xiao Jian; Zhao Gang
2002 Busan	Kazakhstan (KAZ); Alexandr Axenov; Dmitriy Dimov; Sergey Shabalin; Alexey Shipilov	China (CHN); Wang Lei; Xie Yongjun; Zhao Chunsheng; Zhao Gang	South Korea (KOR); Kim Jung-kwan; Ku Kyo-dong; Lee Sang-yup; Yang Roy-sung
2006 Doha	South Korea (KOR); Jung Jin-sun; Kim Seung-gu; Kim Won-jin; Park Sang-sun	China (CHN); Dong Guotao; Wang Lei; Xiao Jian; Xie Yongjun	Iran (IRI); Siamak Feiz-Asgari; Mohammad Rezaei; Hamed Sedaghati; Ali Yaghoubian
2006 Doha	South Korea (KOR); Jung Jin-sun; Kim Seung-gu; Kim Won-jin; Park Sang-sun	China (CHN); Dong Guotao; Wang Lei; Xiao Jian; Xie Yongjun	Kazakhstan (KAZ); Alexandr Axenov; Sergey Khodos; Sergey Shabalin; Alexey Shipilov
2010 Guangzhou	South Korea (KOR); Jung Jin-sun; Jung Seung-hwa; Kim Won-jin; Park Kyoung-doo	Kazakhstan (KAZ); Elmir Alimzhanov; Alexandr Axenov; Dmitriy Gryaznov; Sergey Shabalin	China (CHN); Dong Chao; Li Guojie; Wang Sen; Yin Lianchi
2010 Guangzhou	South Korea (KOR); Jung Jin-sun; Jung Seung-hwa; Kim Won-jin; Park Kyoung-doo	Kazakhstan (KAZ); Elmir Alimzhanov; Alexandr Axenov; Dmitriy Gryaznov; Sergey Shabalin	Japan (JPN); Kazuyasu Minobe; Shogo Nishida; Keisuke Sakamoto
2014 Incheon	South Korea (KOR); Jung Jin-sun; Kweon Young-jun; Park Kyoung-doo; Park Sang-young	Japan (JPN); Kazuyasu Minobe; Keisuke Sakamoto; Masaru Yamada	Kazakhstan (KAZ); Dmitriy Alexanin; Elmir Alimzhanov; Dmitriy Gryaznov; Ruslan Kurbanov
2014 Incheon	South Korea (KOR); Jung Jin-sun; Kweon Young-jun; Park Kyoung-doo; Park Sang-young	Japan (JPN); Kazuyasu Minobe; Keisuke Sakamoto; Masaru Yamada	Vietnam (VIE); Nguyễn Phước Đến; Nguyễn Tiến Nhật; Phạm Hùng Dương; Trương Trần Nhật Minh
2018 Jakarta–Palembang	Japan (JPN); Koki Kano; Kazuyasu Minobe; Satoru Uyama; Masaru Yamada	China (CHN); Dong Chao; Lan Minghao; Shi Gaofeng; Xue Yangdong	Kazakhstan (KAZ); Dmitriy Alexanin; Elmir Alimzhanov; Ruslan Kurbanov; Vadim Sharlaimov
2018 Jakarta–Palembang	Japan (JPN); Koki Kano; Kazuyasu Minobe; Satoru Uyama; Masaru Yamada	China (CHN); Dong Chao; Lan Minghao; Shi Gaofeng; Xue Yangdong	South Korea (KOR); Jung Jin-sun; Kweon Young-jun; Park Kyoung-doo; Park Sang-young
2022 Hangzhou	Japan (JPN); Koki Kano; Akira Komata; Ryu Matsumoto; Masaru Yamada	Kazakhstan (KAZ); Elmir Alimzhanov; Ruslan Kurbanov; Yerlik Sertay; Vadim Sharlaimov	Hong Kong (HKG); Fong Hoi Sun; Ho Wai Hang; Lau Ho Fung; Ng Ho Tin
2022 Hangzhou	Japan (JPN); Koki Kano; Akira Komata; Ryu Matsumoto; Masaru Yamada	Kazakhstan (KAZ); Elmir Alimzhanov; Ruslan Kurbanov; Yerlik Sertay; Vadim Sharlaimov	South Korea (KOR); Kim Jae-won; Kweon Young-jun; Ma Se-geon; Son Tae-jin

=== Individual foil ===
Games	Gold	Silver	Bronze
1974 Tehran	Toshio Jingu (JPN)	Ali Asghar Pashapour (IRN)	Masaya Fukuda (JPN)
1978 Bangkok	Kiyoshi Otsuka (JPN)	Wang Fuyun (CHN)	Hideyuki Itakura (JPN)
1986 Seoul	Ko Nak-choon (KOR)	Cho Jai-bong (KOR)	Lao Shaopei (CHN)
1990 Beijing	Ye Chong (CHN)	Kim Seung-pyo (KOR)	Lao Shaopei (CHN)
1994 Hiroshima	Dong Zhaozhi (CHN)	Yoshihide Nagano (JPN)	You Bong-hyung (KOR)
1998 Bangkok	Wang Haibin (CHN)	Kim Young-ho (KOR)	You Bong-hyung (KOR)
2002 Busan	Wang Haibin (CHN)	Kim Sang-hun (KOR)	Wu Hanxiong (CHN)
2006 Doha	Yuki Ota (JPN)	Lee Cheon-woong (KOR)	Lei Sheng (CHN)
2006 Doha	Yuki Ota (JPN)	Lee Cheon-woong (KOR)	Zhang Liangliang (CHN)
2010 Guangzhou	Choi Byung-chul (KOR)	Cheung Siu Lun (HKG)	Lei Sheng (CHN)
2010 Guangzhou	Choi Byung-chul (KOR)	Cheung Siu Lun (HKG)	Yuki Ota (JPN)
2014 Incheon	Ma Jianfei (CHN)	Heo Jun (KOR)	Chen Haiwei (CHN)
2014 Incheon	Ma Jianfei (CHN)	Heo Jun (KOR)	Yuki Ota (JPN)
2018 Jakarta–Palembang	Huang Mengkai (CHN)	Nicholas Choi (HKG)	Cheung Ka Long (HKG)
2018 Jakarta–Palembang	Huang Mengkai (CHN)	Nicholas Choi (HKG)	Son Young-ki (KOR)
2022 Hangzhou	Cheung Ka Long (HKG)	Chen Haiwei (CHN)	Ryan Choi (HKG)
2022 Hangzhou	Cheung Ka Long (HKG)	Chen Haiwei (CHN)	Takahiro Shikine (JPN)

=== Team foil ===
Games	Gold	Silver	Bronze
1974 Tehran	Japan (JPN)	South Korea (KOR); Kim Doo-kyung; Kim Jung-il; Kim Kuk-hyun; Shin Dong-seok; Sung Ki-man	Iran (IRN); Ahmad Akbari; Parviz Almasi; Sarkis Assadourian; Ali Asghar Pashapour; Kioumars Tolouei
1978 Bangkok	South Korea (KOR); Cha Yul; Kim Doo-kyung; Kim Heon-su; Kim Kuk-hyun	China (CHN); Qiu Hongjun; Wang Fuyun; Wu Fujing; Xu Jianzhong	Japan (JPN); Hideyuki Itakura; Takao Masuoka; Shiro Toshima; Kenichi Umezawa
1986 Seoul	South Korea (KOR); Cho Jai-bong; Hong Young-seung; Kim Seung-pyo; Ko Nak-choon; Lee Young-rok	China (CHN); Lao Shaopei; Liu Yunhong; Yu Yifeng; Zeng Xianhong; Zhang Zhicheng	Japan (JPN); Koji Emura; Hiroshi Hashimoto; Yoshihiko Kimura; Takashi Tomida; Kenichi Umezawa
1990 Beijing	China (CHN); Lao Shaopei; Wang Lihong; Ye Chong; Yin Guimin; Zhang Zhicheng	South Korea (KOR); Hong Young-seung; Hwang Joon-suk; Kim Seung-pyo; Kim Yong-kook; Lee Ho-sung	Hong Kong (HKG); Lee Chung Man; Lo Moon Tong; Tang Kwong Hau; Wong Tsan; Wu Xing Yao
1994 Hiroshima	South Korea (KOR); Chung Soo-ki; Kim Seung-pyo; Kim Yong-kook; Kim Young-ho; You Bong-hyung	China (CHN); Dong Zhaozhi; Wang Haibin; Wang Lihong; Xu Xuening; Ye Chong	Japan (JPN); Yasunori Amao; Yusuke Aoki; Hiroki Ichigatani; Yoshihide Nagano; Akira Tamura
1998 Bangkok	China (CHN); Dong Zhaozhi; Lin Liang; Liu Yuntao; Wang Haibin	Japan (JPN); Yusuke Aoki; Hiroki Fujii; Hiroki Ichigatani; Naoto Okazaki	South Korea (KOR); Kim Seung-pyo; Kim Woon-sung; Kim Young-ho; You Bong-hyung
2002 Busan	China (CHN); Wang Haibin; Wu Hanxiong; Zhang Jie; Zhou Rui	South Korea (KOR); Choi Byung-chul; Kim Sang-hun; Kim Young-ho; Lee Kwan-haeng	Japan (JPN); Yusuke Fukuda; Takashi Okano; Naoto Okazaki; Hayato Shibuki
2006 Doha	China (CHN); Lei Sheng; Wu Hanxiong; Zhang Liangliang; Zhu Jun	South Korea (KOR); Cha Hyung-woo; Choi Byung-chul; Ha Chang-duk; Lee Cheon-woong	Hong Kong (HKG); Cheung Kai Tung; Lau Kwok Kin; Kevin Ngan; Wong Kam Kau
2006 Doha	China (CHN); Lei Sheng; Wu Hanxiong; Zhang Liangliang; Zhu Jun	South Korea (KOR); Cha Hyung-woo; Choi Byung-chul; Ha Chang-duk; Lee Cheon-woong	Japan (JPN); Kenta Chida; Yusuke Fukuda; Yuki Ota
2010 Guangzhou	China (CHN); Huang Liangcai; Lei Sheng; Zhang Liangliang; Zhu Jun	Japan (JPN); Suguru Awaji; Kenta Chida; Yusuke Fukuda; Yuki Ota	Hong Kong (HKG); Cheung Siu Lun; Chu Wing Hong; Lau Kwok Kin; Kevin Ngan
2010 Guangzhou	China (CHN); Huang Liangcai; Lei Sheng; Zhang Liangliang; Zhu Jun	Japan (JPN); Suguru Awaji; Kenta Chida; Yusuke Fukuda; Yuki Ota	South Korea (KOR); Choi Byung-chul; Ha Tae-gyu; Heo Jun; Kwon Young-ho
2014 Incheon	Japan (JPN); Kenta Chida; Daiki Fujino; Ryo Miyake; Yuki Ota	China (CHN); Chen Haiwei; Lei Sheng; Li Chen; Ma Jianfei	Hong Kong (HKG); Cheung Ka Long; Cheung Siu Lun; Nicholas Choi; Yeung Chi Ka
2014 Incheon	Japan (JPN); Kenta Chida; Daiki Fujino; Ryo Miyake; Yuki Ota	China (CHN); Chen Haiwei; Lei Sheng; Li Chen; Ma Jianfei	South Korea (KOR); Heo Jun; Kim Hyo-gon; Kim Min-kyu; Son Young-ki
2018 Jakarta–Palembang	South Korea (KOR); Ha Tae-gyu; Heo Jun; Lee Kwang-hyun; Son Young-ki	Hong Kong (HKG); Cheung Ka Long; Nicholas Choi; Ryan Choi; Yeung Chi Ka	China (CHN); Huang Mengkai; Li Chen; Ma Jianfei; Shi Jialuo
2018 Jakarta–Palembang	South Korea (KOR); Ha Tae-gyu; Heo Jun; Lee Kwang-hyun; Son Young-ki	Hong Kong (HKG); Cheung Ka Long; Nicholas Choi; Ryan Choi; Yeung Chi Ka	Japan (JPN); Kyosuke Matsuyama; Toshiya Saito; Takahiro Shikine; Kenta Suzumura
2022 Hangzhou	South Korea (KOR); Ha Tae-gyu; Heo Jun; Im Cheol-woo; Lee Kwang-hyun	China (CHN); Chen Haiwei; Wu Bin; Xu Jie; Zeng Zhaoran	Hong Kong (HKG); Cheung Ka Long; Nicholas Choi; Ryan Choi; Yeung Chi Ka
2022 Hangzhou	South Korea (KOR); Ha Tae-gyu; Heo Jun; Im Cheol-woo; Lee Kwang-hyun	China (CHN); Chen Haiwei; Wu Bin; Xu Jie; Zeng Zhaoran	Japan (JPN); Kazuki Iimura; Kyosuke Matsuyama; Takahiro Shikine; Kenta Suzumura

=== Individual sabre ===
Games	Gold	Silver	Bronze
1974 Tehran	Atsushi Akiho (JPN)	Abdolhamid Fathi (IRN)	Manouchehr Shafaei (IRN)
1978 Bangkok	Wang Ruiji (CHN)	Tadashi Kawamura (JPN)	Cha Yul (KOR)
1986 Seoul	Wang Xingqi (CHN)	Wang Zhiming (CHN)	Kim Sang-wook (KOR)
1990 Beijing	Wang Zhiming (CHN)	Zheng Zhaokang (CHN)	You Sang-joo (KOR)
1994 Hiroshima	Kim Sang-wook (KOR)	Lee Hyo-kun (KOR)	Katsumi Yamaguchi (JPN)
1998 Bangkok	Guo Rong (CHN)	Ko Young-tae (KOR)	Zhang Lin (CHN)
2002 Busan	Lee Seung-won (KOR)	Wang Jingzhi (CHN)	Kim Doo-hong (KOR)
2006 Doha	Wang Jingzhi (CHN)	Oh Eun-seok (KOR)	Zhou Hanming (CHN)
2006 Doha	Wang Jingzhi (CHN)	Oh Eun-seok (KOR)	Wiradech Kothny (THA)
2010 Guangzhou	Gu Bon-gil (KOR)	Zhong Man (CHN)	Wang Jingzhi (CHN)
2010 Guangzhou	Gu Bon-gil (KOR)	Zhong Man (CHN)	Oh Eun-seok (KOR)
2014 Incheon	Gu Bon-gil (KOR)	Kim Jung-hwan (KOR)	Sun Wei (CHN)
2014 Incheon	Gu Bon-gil (KOR)	Kim Jung-hwan (KOR)	Lam Hin Chung (HKG)
2018 Jakarta–Palembang	Gu Bon-gil (KOR)	Oh Sang-uk (KOR)	Low Ho Tin (HKG)
2018 Jakarta–Palembang	Gu Bon-gil (KOR)	Oh Sang-uk (KOR)	Ali Pakdaman (IRI)
2022 Hangzhou	Oh Sang-uk (KOR)	Gu Bon-gil (KOR)	Mohammad Rahbari (IRI)
2022 Hangzhou	Oh Sang-uk (KOR)	Gu Bon-gil (KOR)	Yousef Al-Shamlan (KUW)

=== Team sabre ===
Games	Gold	Silver	Bronze
1974 Tehran	Iran (IRN); Ahmad Akbari; Ahmad Eskandarpour; Abdolhamid Fathi; Esmaeil Pashapour; Manouchehr Shafaei	Japan (JPN); Atsushi Akiho; Masaya Fukuda; Hideaki Kamei; Hiroshi Nakajima	China (CHN); Liu Mao; Shen Changjie; Wang Pinzhang; Zhang Baoren
1978 Bangkok	Japan (JPN); Atsushi Akiho; Ryokichi Fukushima; Tadashi Kawamura; Kiyoshi Otsuka	China (CHN); Chen Jinchu; Wang Ruiji; Yang Shisheng; Zhang Baoren	South Korea (KOR); Cha Yul; Cho Jae-bong; Kim Doo-kyung; Kim Kuk-hyun
1986 Seoul	China (CHN); Chen Jinchu; Huang Weixiong; Wang Xingqi; Wang Zhiming; Zheng Zhaokang	South Korea (KOR); Cho Jong-hyung; Jeung Hun; Kim Sang-wook; Lee Byung-nam; Lee Wook-jae	Japan (JPN); Junichi Chiba; Koji Emura; Yoshihiko Kanatsu; Satoshi Sawada; Mitsuharu Yoshizawa
1990 Beijing	China (CHN); Jia Guihua; Jiang Yefei; Wang Zhiming; Yang Zhen; Zheng Zhaokang	South Korea (KOR); Kim Sang-wook; Lee Hyo-kun; Lee Hyun-soo; Lee Wook-jae; You Sang-joo	Japan (JPN); Koji Emura; Yoshihiko Kanatsu; Osamu Nakamura; Mineo Noro; Satoshi Sawada
1994 Hiroshima	China (CHN); Qiao Min; Li Yi; Ning Xiankui; Wang Lihong; Yang Zhen	South Korea (KOR); Kim Sang-wook; Lee Hyo-kun; Lee Hyun-soo; Lee Soo-kum; You Sang-joo	Japan (JPN); Yoshihide Chiba; Koji Emura; Hiroshi Hashimoto; Tadayoshi Kato; Katsumi Yamaguchi
1998 Bangkok	South Korea (KOR); Kim Doo-hong; Ko Young-tae; Lee Hyun-soo; Seo Sung-jun	China (CHN); Guo Rong; Liu Yuntao; Yan Weidong; Zhang Lin	Iran (IRI); Peyman Fakhri; Mohammad Mirmohammadi; Amir Mohaymen Rahimi; Abbas Sheikholeslami
2002 Busan	South Korea (KOR); Kim Doo-hong; Lee Hyuk; Lee Seung-won; Seo Sung-jun	China (CHN); Chen Feng; Wang Jingzhi; Zhao Chunsheng; Zhou Hanming	Kazakhstan (KAZ); Yevgeniy Frolov; Sergey Sleptsov; Sergey Smirnov; Igor Tsel
2006 Doha	China (CHN); Huang Yaojiang; Wang Jingzhi; Zhou Hanming; Zhu Jun	South Korea (KOR); Lee Hyuk; Oh Eun-seok; Oh Seung-hwan; Won Woo-young	Japan (JPN); Masashi Nagara; Tatsuro Watanabe; Koji Yamamoto
2006 Doha	China (CHN); Huang Yaojiang; Wang Jingzhi; Zhou Hanming; Zhu Jun	South Korea (KOR); Lee Hyuk; Oh Eun-seok; Oh Seung-hwan; Won Woo-young	Thailand (THA); Natee Kattancharoen; Ekkathet Ketiam; Wiradech Kothny; Sares Limkangwanmongkol
2010 Guangzhou	China (CHN); Jiang Kelü; Liu Xiao; Wang Jingzhi; Zhong Man	South Korea (KOR); Gu Bon-gil; Kim Jung-hwan; Oh Eun-seok; Won Woo-young	Japan (JPN); Shinya Kudo; Satoshi Ogawa; Koji Yamamoto
2010 Guangzhou	China (CHN); Jiang Kelü; Liu Xiao; Wang Jingzhi; Zhong Man	South Korea (KOR); Gu Bon-gil; Kim Jung-hwan; Oh Eun-seok; Won Woo-young	Kazakhstan (KAZ); Yevgeniy Frolov; Yerali Tilenshiyev; Zhanserik Turlybekov
2014 Incheon	South Korea (KOR); Gu Bon-gil; Kim Jung-hwan; Oh Eun-seok; Won Woo-young	Iran (IRI); Mojtaba Abedini; Farzad Baher; Ali Pakdaman; Mohammad Rahbari	China (CHN); Fang Xin; Sun Wei; Tan Sheng; Xu Yingming
2014 Incheon	South Korea (KOR); Gu Bon-gil; Kim Jung-hwan; Oh Eun-seok; Won Woo-young	Iran (IRI); Mojtaba Abedini; Farzad Baher; Ali Pakdaman; Mohammad Rahbari	Hong Kong (HKG); Cyrus Chang; Lam Hin Chung; Low Ho Tin; Yan Hon Pan
2018 Jakarta–Palembang	South Korea (KOR); Gu Bon-gil; Kim Jun-ho; Kim Jung-hwan; Oh Sang-uk	Iran (IRI); Mojtaba Abedini; Farzad Baher; Ali Pakdaman; Mohammad Rahbari	China (CHN); Lu Yang; Wang Shi; Xu Yingming; Yan Yinghui
2018 Jakarta–Palembang	South Korea (KOR); Gu Bon-gil; Kim Jun-ho; Kim Jung-hwan; Oh Sang-uk	Iran (IRI); Mojtaba Abedini; Farzad Baher; Ali Pakdaman; Mohammad Rahbari	Hong Kong (HKG); Cyrus Chang; Lam Hin Chung; Terence Lee; Low Ho Tin
2022 Hangzhou	South Korea (KOR); Gu Bon-gil; Kim Jun-ho; Kim Jung-hwan; Oh Sang-uk	China (CHN); Liang Jianhao; Lin Xiao; Shen Chenpeng; Yan Yinghui	Iran (IRI); Farzad Baher; Mohammad Fotouhi; Ali Pakdaman; Mohammad Rahbari
2022 Hangzhou	South Korea (KOR); Gu Bon-gil; Kim Jun-ho; Kim Jung-hwan; Oh Sang-uk	China (CHN); Liang Jianhao; Lin Xiao; Shen Chenpeng; Yan Yinghui	Kazakhstan (KAZ); Zhanat Nabiyev; Mukhamedali Rakhmanali; Artyom Sarkissyan; Nazarbay Sattarkhan

== Women ==
=== Individual épée ===
Games	Gold	Silver	Bronze
1990 Beijing	Zhai Xiumin (CHN)	Silvia Koeswandi (INA)	Liang Qin (CHN)
1998 Bangkok	Ko Jung-sun (KOR)	Shen Weiwei (CHN)	Yang Shaoqi (CHN)
2002 Busan	Kim Hee-jeong (KOR)	Hyun Hee (KOR)	Shen Weiwei (CHN)
2006 Doha	Park Se-ra (KOR)	Zhong Weiping (CHN)	Li Na (CHN)
2006 Doha	Park Se-ra (KOR)	Zhong Weiping (CHN)	Shin A-lam (KOR)
2010 Guangzhou	Luo Xiaojuan (CHN)	Nozomi Nakano (JPN)	Xu Anqi (CHN)
2010 Guangzhou	Luo Xiaojuan (CHN)	Nozomi Nakano (JPN)	Yeung Chui Ling (HKG)
2014 Incheon	Sun Yujie (CHN)	Shin A-lam (KOR)	Vivian Kong (HKG)
2014 Incheon	Sun Yujie (CHN)	Shin A-lam (KOR)	Choi In-jeong (KOR)
2018 Jakarta–Palembang	Kang Young-mi (KOR)	Sun Yiwen (CHN)	Vivian Kong (HKG)
2018 Jakarta–Palembang	Kang Young-mi (KOR)	Sun Yiwen (CHN)	Choi In-jeong (KOR)
2022 Hangzhou	Choi In-jeong (KOR)	Song Se-ra (KOR)	Vivian Kong (HKG)
2022 Hangzhou	Choi In-jeong (KOR)	Song Se-ra (KOR)	Dilnaz Murzataeva (UZB)

=== Team épée ===
Games	Gold	Silver	Bronze
1990 Beijing	China (CHN); Liang Qin; Wen Dong; Yan Jing; Zhai Xiumin; Zhou Ping	South Korea (KOR); Jeon Soon-mi; Jeong Myung-soo; Kim Myung-ja; Lee Soon-ie; Park Soo-mi	Indonesia (INA); Silvia Koeswandi; Rini Poniman; Sri Ayanti Satimin; Sumiani
1998 Bangkok	China (CHN); Liang Qin; Liang Shuxian; Shen Weiwei; Yang Shaoqi	South Korea (KOR); Kim Kyung-ja; Ko Jung-sun; Lee Keum-nam; Lee Myung-hee	Japan (JPN); Yuko Arai; Toshi Obata; Chieko Okada; Remi Shozui
2002 Busan	South Korea (KOR); Hyun Hee; Kim Hee-jeong; Kim Mi-jung; Lee Keum-nam	China (CHN); Li Na; Shen Weiwei; Zhang Li; Zhong Weiping	Hong Kong (HKG); Bjork Cheng; Cheung Yi Nei; Ho Ka Lai; Yeung Chui Ling
2006 Doha	China (CHN); Li Na; Luo Xiaojuan; Zhang Li; Zhong Weiping	South Korea (KOR); Choi Eun-sook; Jung Hyo-jung; Park Se-ra; Shin A-lam	Hong Kong (HKG); Bjork Cheng; Cheung Yi Nei; Sabrina Lui; Yeung Chui Ling
2006 Doha	China (CHN); Li Na; Luo Xiaojuan; Zhang Li; Zhong Weiping	South Korea (KOR); Choi Eun-sook; Jung Hyo-jung; Park Se-ra; Shin A-lam	Japan (JPN); Shizuka Ikehata; Hiroko Narita; Yoshie Takeyama
2010 Guangzhou	Japan (JPN); Megumi Ikeda; Nozomi Nakano; Ayaka Shimookawa	China (CHN); Luo Xiaojuan; Sun Yujie; Xu Anqi; Yin Mingfang	Hong Kong (HKG); Bjork Cheng; Cheung Sik Lui; Sabrina Lui; Yeung Chui Ling
2010 Guangzhou	Japan (JPN); Megumi Ikeda; Nozomi Nakano; Ayaka Shimookawa	China (CHN); Luo Xiaojuan; Sun Yujie; Xu Anqi; Yin Mingfang	South Korea (KOR); Jung Hyo-jung; Oh Yun-hee; Park Se-ra; Shin A-lam
2014 Incheon	China (CHN); Hao Jialu; Sun Yiwen; Sun Yujie; Xu Anqi	South Korea (KOR); Choi Eun-sook; Choi In-jeong; Kim Myoung-sun; Shin A-lam	Hong Kong (HKG); Chu Ka Mong; Vivian Kong; Coco Lin; Yeung Chui Ling
2014 Incheon	China (CHN); Hao Jialu; Sun Yiwen; Sun Yujie; Xu Anqi	South Korea (KOR); Choi Eun-sook; Choi In-jeong; Kim Myoung-sun; Shin A-lam	Japan (JPN); Rie Ohashi; Ayaka Shimookawa; Ayumi Yamada
2018 Jakarta–Palembang	China (CHN); Lin Sheng; Sun Yiwen; Xu Chengzi; Zhu Mingye	South Korea (KOR); Choi In-jeong; Kang Young-mi; Lee Hye-in; Shin A-lam	Hong Kong (HKG); Chu Ka Mong; Kaylin Hsieh; Vivian Kong; Coco Lin
2018 Jakarta–Palembang	China (CHN); Lin Sheng; Sun Yiwen; Xu Chengzi; Zhu Mingye	South Korea (KOR); Choi In-jeong; Kang Young-mi; Lee Hye-in; Shin A-lam	Japan (JPN); Haruna Baba; Shiori Komata; Kanna Oishi; Ayumi Yamada
2022 Hangzhou	South Korea (KOR); Choi In-jeong; Kang Young-mi; Lee Hye-in; Song Se-ra	Hong Kong (HKG); Chan Wai Ling; Chu Ka Mong; Kaylin Hsieh; Vivian Kong	China (CHN); Shi Yuexin; Sun Yiwen; Tang Junyao; Xu Nuo
2022 Hangzhou	South Korea (KOR); Choi In-jeong; Kang Young-mi; Lee Hye-in; Song Se-ra	Hong Kong (HKG); Chan Wai Ling; Chu Ka Mong; Kaylin Hsieh; Vivian Kong	Japan (JPN); Haruna Baba; Hana Saito; Nozomi Sato; Miho Yoshimura

=== Individual foil ===
Games	Gold	Silver	Bronze
1974 Tehran	Hiroko Kamada (JPN)	Mahvash Shafaei (IRN)	Giti Mohebban (IRN)
1978 Bangkok	Luan Jujie (CHN)	Zhu Qingyuan (CHN)	Masako Yoshioka (JPN)
1986 Seoul	Li Huahua (CHN)	Luan Jujie (CHN)	Zhu Qingyuan (CHN)
1990 Beijing	Tak Jung-im (KOR)	Xiao Aihua (CHN)	E Jie (CHN)
1994 Hiroshima	Xiao Aihua (CHN)	Chang Mi-kyung (KOR)	Lee Jeong-sook (KOR)
1998 Bangkok	Xiao Aihua (CHN)	Lim Mi-kyung (KOR)	Du Yunjie (CHN)
2002 Busan	Zhang Lei (CHN)	Lim Mi-kyung (KOR)	Seo Mi-jung (KOR)
2006 Doha	Nam Hyun-hee (KOR)	Seo Mi-jung (KOR)	Chen Jinyan (CHN)
2006 Doha	Nam Hyun-hee (KOR)	Seo Mi-jung (KOR)	Yoko Makishita (JPN)
2010 Guangzhou	Nam Hyun-hee (KOR)	Chen Jinyan (CHN)	Dai Huili (CHN)
2010 Guangzhou	Nam Hyun-hee (KOR)	Chen Jinyan (CHN)	Jeon Hee-sook (KOR)
2014 Incheon	Jeon Hee-sook (KOR)	Le Huilin (CHN)	Lin Po Heung (HKG)
2014 Incheon	Jeon Hee-sook (KOR)	Le Huilin (CHN)	Nam Hyun-hee (KOR)
2018 Jakarta–Palembang	Jeon Hee-sook (KOR)	Fu Yiting (CHN)	Liu Yan Wai (HKG)
2018 Jakarta–Palembang	Jeon Hee-sook (KOR)	Fu Yiting (CHN)	Sera Azuma (JPN)
2022 Hangzhou	Huang Qianqian (CHN)	Yuka Ueno (JPN)	Daphne Chan (HKG)
2022 Hangzhou	Huang Qianqian (CHN)	Yuka Ueno (JPN)	Hong Se-na (KOR)

=== Team foil ===
Games	Gold	Silver	Bronze
1974 Tehran	Iran (IRN); Maryam Achak; Jila Almasi; Giti Mohebban; Mahvash Shafaei; Maryam Shariatzadeh	Japan (JPN)	Israel (ISR); Nurit Carmi; Nili Drori; Inbar Guy; Orli Schreiber
1978 Bangkok	China (CHN); Hu Yubao; Luan Jujie; Su Lianfeng; Zhu Qingyuan	Japan (JPN); Yukari Itakura; Machiko Ito; Hiroko Kawamura; Masako Yoshioka	Indonesia (INA); Rita Piri Hehanusa; Wahyu Hertati; Silvia Koeswandi; Slamet Poerawinata
1986 Seoul	China (CHN); Cheng Xianhua; Li Huahua; Luan Jujie; Zhang Jianqiu; Zhu Qingyuan	South Korea (KOR); Jeon Soon-young; Oh Seung-soon; Park Soon-ai; Shin Seong-ja; Tak Jung-im	Japan (JPN); Mariko Kanazawa; Mieko Miyahara; Kiyomi Nakayama; Tomoko Oka; Yuko Takayanagi
1990 Beijing	China (CHN); E Jie; Liang Jun; Sun Hongyun; Wang Huifeng; Xiao Aihua	South Korea (KOR); Jeong Che-gu; Kim Jin-soon; Lee Jeon-hee; Shin Seong-ja; Tak Jung-im	Japan (JPN); Ayako Kato; Nona Kiritani; Mieko Miyahara; Rika Monogaki; Yuko Takayanagi
1994 Hiroshima	China (CHN); Liang Jun; Wang Huifeng; Xiao Aihua; Ye Lin	Japan (JPN); Ayako Kato; Nona Kiritani; Rika Monogaki; Yuko Takayanagi; Miki Yoshimatsu	South Korea (KOR); Chang Mi-kyung; Chun Mi-kyung; Lee Hwa-young; Lee Jeong-sook; Lim Mi-kyung
1998 Bangkok	South Korea (KOR); Chun Mi-kyung; Lim Mi-kyung; Kim Dong-im; Lee Tae-hee	China (CHN); Du Yunjie; Huang Minna; Wang Huifeng; Xiao Aihua	Japan (JPN); Yuko Arai; Masako Kobayashi; Chieko Okada; Miwako Shimada
2002 Busan	South Korea (KOR); Lim Mi-kyung; Nam Hyun-hee; Oh Tae-young; Seo Mi-jung	China (CHN); Liu Yuan; Ma Na; Meng Jie; Zhang Lei	Japan (JPN); Yuko Arai; Madoka Hisagae; Chieko Sugawara; Mika Uchiyama
2006 Doha	South Korea (KOR); Jeon Hee-sook; Jung Gil-ok; Nam Hyun-hee; Seo Mi-jung	China (CHN); Chen Jinyan; Huang Jialing; Su Wanwen; Zhang Ying	Japan (JPN); Maki Kawanishi; Yoko Makishita; Chieko Sugawara
2006 Doha	South Korea (KOR); Jeon Hee-sook; Jung Gil-ok; Nam Hyun-hee; Seo Mi-jung	China (CHN); Chen Jinyan; Huang Jialing; Su Wanwen; Zhang Ying	Kazakhstan (KAZ); Olga Antipova; Irina Fichshenko; Natalya Kazantseva; Yelena Kazantseva
2010 Guangzhou	South Korea (KOR); Jeon Hee-sook; Nam Hyun-hee; Oh Ha-na; Seo Mi-jung	Japan (JPN); Kanae Ikehata; Shiho Nishioka; Chie Yoshizawa	China (CHN); Chen Jinyan; Dai Huili; Le Huilin; Shi Yun
2010 Guangzhou	South Korea (KOR); Jeon Hee-sook; Nam Hyun-hee; Oh Ha-na; Seo Mi-jung	Japan (JPN); Kanae Ikehata; Shiho Nishioka; Chie Yoshizawa	Hong Kong (HKG); Valerie Cheng; Cheung Ho King; Lau Hiu Wai; Lin Po Heung
2014 Incheon	South Korea (KOR); Jeon Hee-sook; Kim Mi-na; Nam Hyun-hee; Oh Ha-na	China (CHN); Chen Bingbing; Le Huilin; Liu Yongshi; Wang Chen	Hong Kong (HKG); Cheng Hiu Lam; Kimberley Cheung; Lin Po Heung; Liu Yan Wai
2014 Incheon	South Korea (KOR); Jeon Hee-sook; Kim Mi-na; Nam Hyun-hee; Oh Ha-na	China (CHN); Chen Bingbing; Le Huilin; Liu Yongshi; Wang Chen	Japan (JPN); Karin Miyawaki; Shiho Nishioka; Haruka Yanaoka
2018 Jakarta–Palembang	Japan (JPN); Sera Azuma; Komaki Kikuchi; Karin Miyawaki; Sumire Tsuji	China (CHN); Chen Qingyuan; Fu Yiting; Huo Xingxin; Shi Yue	South Korea (KOR); Chae Song-oh; Hong Seo-in; Jeon Hee-sook; Nam Hyun-hee
2018 Jakarta–Palembang	Japan (JPN); Sera Azuma; Komaki Kikuchi; Karin Miyawaki; Sumire Tsuji	China (CHN); Chen Qingyuan; Fu Yiting; Huo Xingxin; Shi Yue	Singapore (SGP); Amita Berthier; Melanie Huang; Maxine Wong; Tatiana Wong
2022 Hangzhou	China (CHN); Chen Qingyuan; Huang Qianqian; Wang Yingying; Wang Yuting	South Korea (KOR); Chae Song-oh; Hong Hyo-jin; Hong Se-na; Hong Seo-in	Hong Kong (HKG); Daphne Chan; Valerie Cheng; Kuan Yu Ching; Sophia Wu
2022 Hangzhou	China (CHN); Chen Qingyuan; Huang Qianqian; Wang Yingying; Wang Yuting	South Korea (KOR); Chae Song-oh; Hong Hyo-jin; Hong Se-na; Hong Seo-in	Japan (JPN); Sera Azuma; Komaki Kikuchi; Karin Miyawaki; Yuka Ueno

=== Individual sabre ===
Games	Gold	Silver	Bronze
2002 Busan	Lee Shin-mi (KOR)	Lee Gyu-young (KOR)	Tan Xue (CHN)
2006 Doha	Tan Xue (CHN)	Zhao Yuanyuan (CHN)	Chow Tsz Ki (HKG)
2006 Doha	Tan Xue (CHN)	Zhao Yuanyuan (CHN)	Kim Keum-hwa (KOR)
2010 Guangzhou	Kim Hye-lim (KOR)	Au Sin Ying (HKG)	Tan Xue (CHN)
2010 Guangzhou	Kim Hye-lim (KOR)	Au Sin Ying (HKG)	Kim Keum-hwa (KOR)
2014 Incheon	Lee Ra-jin (KOR)	Kim Ji-yeon (KOR)	Li Fei (CHN)
2014 Incheon	Lee Ra-jin (KOR)	Kim Ji-yeon (KOR)	Shen Chen (CHN)
2018 Jakarta–Palembang	Qian Jiarui (CHN)	Shao Yaqi (CHN)	Norika Tamura (JPN)
2018 Jakarta–Palembang	Qian Jiarui (CHN)	Shao Yaqi (CHN)	Kim Ji-yeon (KOR)
2022 Hangzhou	Yoon Ji-su (KOR)	Shao Yaqi (CHN)	Seri Ozaki (JPN)
2022 Hangzhou	Yoon Ji-su (KOR)	Shao Yaqi (CHN)	Zaynab Dayibekova (UZB)

=== Team sabre ===
Games	Gold	Silver	Bronze
2002 Busan	China (CHN); Bao Yingying; Huang Haiyang; Tan Xue; Zhang Ying	South Korea (KOR); Cho Kyung-mi; Kim Hee-yeon; Lee Gyu-young; Lee Shin-mi	Japan (JPN); Madoka Hisagae; Miyuki Kano; Chiyo Ogawa; Chieko Sugawara
2006 Doha	China (CHN); Huang Haiyang; Tan Xue; Zhang Ying; Zhao Yuanyuan	South Korea (KOR); Jang Hyun-kyung; Kim Hye-lim; Kim Keum-hwa; Lee Shin-mi	Hong Kong (HKG); Au Yeung Wai Sum; Chow Tsz Ki; Akina Pau; Tsui Wan Yi
2006 Doha	China (CHN); Huang Haiyang; Tan Xue; Zhang Ying; Zhao Yuanyuan	South Korea (KOR); Jang Hyun-kyung; Kim Hye-lim; Kim Keum-hwa; Lee Shin-mi	Japan (JPN); Madoka Hisagae; Sakura Kaneko; Haruko Nakamura
2010 Guangzhou	China (CHN); Bao Yingying; Chen Xiaodong; Tan Xue; Zhu Min	South Korea (KOR); Kim Hye-lim; Kim Keum-hwa; Lee Ra-jin; Lee Woo-ree	Hong Kong (HKG); Au Sin Ying; Au Yeung Wai Sum; Fong Yi Tak; Lam Hin Wai
2010 Guangzhou	China (CHN); Bao Yingying; Chen Xiaodong; Tan Xue; Zhu Min	South Korea (KOR); Kim Hye-lim; Kim Keum-hwa; Lee Ra-jin; Lee Woo-ree	Kazakhstan (KAZ); Aliya Bekturganova; Anastassiya Gimatdinova; Tamara Pochekutova; Yuliya Zhivitsa
2014 Incheon	South Korea (KOR); Hwang Seon-a; Kim Ji-yeon; Lee Ra-jin; Yoon Ji-su	China (CHN); Li Fei; Qian Jiarui; Shen Chen; Yu Xinting	Hong Kong (HKG); Au Sin Ying; Karen Chang; Jenny Ho; Lam Hin Wai
2014 Incheon	South Korea (KOR); Hwang Seon-a; Kim Ji-yeon; Lee Ra-jin; Yoon Ji-su	China (CHN); Li Fei; Qian Jiarui; Shen Chen; Yu Xinting	Kazakhstan (KAZ); Diana Pamansha; Tamara Pochekutova; Tatyana Prikhodko; Yuliya Zhivitsa
2018 Jakarta–Palembang	South Korea (KOR); Choi Soo-yeon; Hwang Seon-a; Kim Ji-yeon; Yoon Ji-su	China (CHN); Ma Yingjia; Qian Jiarui; Shao Yaqi; Yang Hengyu	Japan (JPN); Chika Aoki; Shihomi Fukushima; Risa Takashima; Norika Tamura
2018 Jakarta–Palembang	South Korea (KOR); Choi Soo-yeon; Hwang Seon-a; Kim Ji-yeon; Yoon Ji-su	China (CHN); Ma Yingjia; Qian Jiarui; Shao Yaqi; Yang Hengyu	Kazakhstan (KAZ); Aibike Khabibullina; Tamara Pochekutova; Tatyana Prikhodko; Aigerim Sarybay
2022 Hangzhou	Uzbekistan (UZB); Zaynab Dayibekova; Fernanda Herrera; Gulistan Perdebaeva; Paola Pliego	Japan (JPN); Misaki Emura; Shihomi Fukushima; Kanae Kobayashi; Seri Ozaki	China (CHN); Lin Kesi; Shao Yaqi; Yang Hengyu; Zhang Xinyi
2022 Hangzhou	Uzbekistan (UZB); Zaynab Dayibekova; Fernanda Herrera; Gulistan Perdebaeva; Paola Pliego	Japan (JPN); Misaki Emura; Shihomi Fukushima; Kanae Kobayashi; Seri Ozaki	South Korea (KOR); Choi Se-bin; Hong Ha-eun; Jeon Eun-hye; Yoon Ji-su
