= Fencing at the 1990 Asian Games =

- Venue: Muxiyuan Gymnasium
- Dates: 24 September – 4 October 1990

Fencing at the 1990 Asian Games was held in Beijing, China from September 24 to October 4, 1990.

== Medalists ==
=== Men ===
Event	Gold	Silver	Bronze
Individual épée	Yang Dal-sik; South Korea	Chang Tae-suk; South Korea	Lee Sang-ki; South Korea
Team épée	South Korea; Chang Tae-suk; Cho Hee-jae; Lee Sang-ki; Yang Dal-sik; Yoon Nam-jin	China; Du Zhencheng; Ma Zhi; Wang Qun; Xu Xuening; Yang Wenyong	Japan; Masatoshi Mino; Kosei Murakami; Tetsuhisa Murakami; Hitoshi Nishigaki; Masahiro Sato
Individual foil	Ye Chong; China	Kim Seung-pyo; South Korea	Lao Shaopei; China
Team foil	China; Lao Shaopei; Wang Lihong; Ye Chong; Yin Guimin; Zhang Zhicheng	South Korea; Hong Young-seung; Hwang Joon-suk; Kim Seung-pyo; Kim Yong-kook; Lee Ho-sung	Hong Kong; Lee Chung Man; Lo Moon Tong; Tang Kwong Hau; Wong Tsan; Wu Xing Yao
Individual sabre	Wang Zhiming; China	Zheng Zhaokang; China	You Sang-joo; South Korea
Team sabre	China; Jia Guihua; Jiang Yefei; Wang Zhiming; Yang Zhen; Zheng Zhaokang	South Korea; Kim Sang-wook; Lee Hyo-kun; Lee Hyun-soo; Lee Wook-jae; You Sang-joo	Japan; Koji Emura; Yoshihiko Kanatsu; Osamu Nakamura; Mineo Noro; Satoshi Sawada

=== Women ===
Event	Gold	Silver	Bronze
Individual épée	Zhai Xiumin; China	Silvia Koeswandi; Indonesia	Liang Qin; China
Team épée	China; Liang Qin; Wen Dong; Yan Jing; Zhai Xiumin; Zhou Ping	South Korea; Jeon Soon-mi; Jeong Myung-soo; Kim Myung-ja; Lee Soon-ie; Park Soo-mi	Indonesia; Silvia Koeswandi; Rini Poniman; Sri Ayanti Satimin; Sumiani
Individual foil	Tak Jung-im; South Korea	Xiao Aihua; China	E Jie; China
Team foil	China; E Jie; Liang Jun; Sun Hongyun; Wang Huifeng; Xiao Aihua	South Korea; Jeong Che-gu; Kim Jin-soon; Lee Jeon-hee; Shin Seong-ja; Tak Jung-im	Japan; Ayako Kato; Nona Kiritani; Mieko Miyahara; Rika Monogaki; Yuko Takayanagi

== Medal table ==
Rank	Nation	Gold	Silver	Bronze	Total
1	China (CHN)	7	3	3	13
2	South Korea (KOR)	3	6	2	11
3	Indonesia (INA)	0	1	1	2
4	Japan (JPN)	0	0	3	3
5	Hong Kong (HKG)	0	0	1	1
Totals (5 entries)		10	10	10	30
