= Fencing at the 1994 Asian Games =

- Venue: Mihara Region Plaza
- Dates: 3–10 October 1994

Fencing at the 1994 Asian Games was held in Hiroshima, Japan from October 3 to October 10, 1994.

== Medalists ==
=== Men ===
Event	Gold	Silver	Bronze
Individual épée	Xu Xuening; China	Alexey Pistsov; Kazakhstan	Sergey Shabalin; Kazakhstan
Team épée	Kazakhstan; Dmitriy Dimov; Andrey Mazanov; Alexey Pistsov; Sergey Shabalin; Yuriy Tsvetov	China; Du Zhencheng; Xu Xuening; Xu Zhongzhu; Ye Chong; Zhao Gang	South Korea; Ku Kyo-dong; Lee Sang-ki; Lee Sang-yup; Park Choon-koan; Yoon Won-jin
Individual foil	Dong Zhaozhi; China	Yoshihide Nagano; Japan	You Bong-hyung; South Korea
Team foil	South Korea; Chung Soo-ki; Kim Seung-pyo; Kim Yong-kook; Kim Young-ho; You Bong-hyung	China; Dong Zhaozhi; Wang Haibin; Wang Lihong; Xu Xuening; Ye Chong	Japan; Yasunori Amao; Yusuke Aoki; Hiroki Ichigatani; Yoshihide Nagano; Akira Tamura
Individual sabre	Kim Sang-wook; South Korea	Lee Hyo-kun; South Korea	Katsumi Yamaguchi; Japan
Team sabre	China; Qiao Min; Li Yi; Ning Xiankui; Wang Lihong; Yang Zhen	South Korea; Kim Sang-wook; Lee Hyo-kun; Lee Hyun-soo; Lee Soo-kum; You Sang-joo	Japan; Yoshihide Chiba; Koji Emura; Hiroshi Hashimoto; Tadayoshi Kato; Katsumi Yamaguchi

=== Women ===
Event	Gold	Silver	Bronze
Individual foil	Xiao Aihua; China	Chang Mi-kyung; South Korea	Lee Jeong-sook; South Korea
Team foil	China; Liang Jun; Wang Huifeng; Xiao Aihua; Ye Lin	Japan; Ayako Kato; Nona Kiritani; Rika Monogaki; Yuko Takayanagi; Miki Yoshimatsu	South Korea; Chang Mi-kyung; Chun Mi-kyung; Lee Hwa-young; Lee Jeong-sook; Lim Mi-kyung

== Medal table ==
Rank	Nation	Gold	Silver	Bronze	Total
1	China (CHN)	5	2	0	7
2	South Korea (KOR)	2	3	4	9
3	Kazakhstan (KAZ)	1	1	1	3
4	Japan (JPN)	0	2	3	5
Totals (4 entries)		8	8	8	24
