= Fencing at the 1986 Asian Games =

- Venue: Olympic Fencing Gymnasium
- Dates: 25 September – 1 October 1986

Fencing at the 1986 Asian Games was held in Seoul, South Korea from September 25 to October 1, 1986.

== Medalists ==
=== Men ===
Event	Gold	Silver	Bronze
Individual épée	Lee Il-hee; South Korea	Ma Zhi; China	Kim Bong-man; South Korea
Team épée	South Korea; Choi Jeung-sik; Kim Bong-man; Lee Il-hee; Lee Sang-ki; Yoon Nam-jin	China; Huang Zhen; Kang Yan; Ma Zhi; Yao Yong; Zong Xiangqing	Japan; Hironao Nagai; Masahiro Sato; Toshihiko Sugawara; Keiju Suzuki
Individual foil	Ko Nak-choon; South Korea	Cho Jai-bong; South Korea	Lao Shaopei; China
Team foil	South Korea; Cho Jai-bong; Hong Young-seung; Kim Seung-pyo; Ko Nak-choon; Lee Young-rok	China; Lao Shaopei; Liu Yunhong; Yu Yifeng; Zeng Xianhong; Zhang Zhicheng	Japan; Koji Emura; Hiroshi Hashimoto; Yoshihiko Kimura; Takashi Tomida; Kenichi Umezawa
Individual sabre	Wang Xingqi; China	Wang Zhiming; China	Kim Sang-wook; South Korea
Team sabre	China; Chen Jinchu; Huang Weixiong; Wang Xingqi; Wang Zhiming; Zheng Zhaokang	South Korea; Cho Jong-hyung; Jeung Hun; Kim Sang-wook; Lee Byung-nam; Lee Wook-jae	Japan; Junichi Chiba; Koji Emura; Yoshihiko Kanatsu; Satoshi Sawada; Mitsuharu Yoshizawa

=== Women ===
Event	Gold	Silver	Bronze
Individual foil	Li Huahua; China	Luan Jujie; China	Zhu Qingyuan; China
Team foil	China; Cheng Xianhua; Li Huahua; Luan Jujie; Zhang Jianqiu; Zhu Qingyuan	South Korea; Jeon Soon-young; Oh Seung-soon; Park Soon-ai; Shin Seong-ja; Tak Jung-im	Japan; Mariko Kanazawa; Mieko Miyahara; Kiyomi Nakayama; Tomoko Oka; Yuko Takayanagi

== Medal table ==
Rank	Nation	Gold	Silver	Bronze	Total
1	China (CHN)	4	5	2	11
2	South Korea (KOR)	4	3	2	9
3	Japan (JPN)	0	0	4	4
Totals (3 entries)		8	8	8	24
