= Fencing at the 1998 Asian Games – Men's individual sabre =

Men's individual sabre at the 1998 Asian Games
- Venue: Thammasat Gymnasium 4
- Date: 13 December 1998
- Competitors: 33 from 11 nations

Medalists
gold medal	Guo Rong	China
silver medal	Ko Young-tae	South Korea
bronze medal	Zhang Lin	China

The men's individual sabre competition at the 1998 Asian Games in Bangkok was held on 13 December 1998 at the Thammasat Gymnasium 4.

== Schedule ==
All times are Indochina Time (UTC+07:00)

Date	Time	Event
Sunday, 13 December 1998	09:00	Preliminaries
Sunday, 13 December 1998	15:00	Finals

== Results ==
=== Round of pools ===
==== Pool A ====
Athlete	KUW	KAZ	TPE	HKG	IRI	JPN
Abdulkarim Al-Shamlan (KUW)	—	3–5	3–5	3–5	2–5	2–5
Viktor Yegorov (KAZ)	5–3	—	5–1	5–1	5–1	3–5
Huang Tzu-hua (TPE)	5–3	1–5	—	5–1	5–1	3–5
Kong Chi Chung (HKG)	5–3	1–5	1–5	—	5–3	3–5
Amir Mohaymen Rahimi (IRI)	5–2	1–5	1–5	3–5	—	4–5
Masaki Shimoda (JPN)	5–2	5–3	5–3	5–3	5–4	—

==== Pool B ====
Athlete	KUW	IRI	CHN	TPE	KAZ	UZB
Tareq Faisal (KUW)	—	0–5	2–5	2–5	5–4	2–5
Peyman Fakhri (IRI)	5–0	—	4–5	5–1	3–5	5–3
Guo Rong (CHN)	5–2	5–4	—	5–4	5–2	5–2
Huang Chen-wei (TPE)	5–2	1–5	4–5	—	2–5	4–5
Serik Raimbekov (KAZ)	4–5	5–3	2–5	5–2	—	5–4
Aleksey Savinkov (UZB)	5–2	3–5	2–5	5–4	4–5	—

==== Pool C ====
Athlete	KUW	THA	JPN	PHI	KOR	IRI	CHN
Abdul Al-Fadhli (KUW)	—	5–1	1–5	1–5	2–5	2–5	0–5
Sirawut Chuensiwa (THA)	1–5	—	1–5	5–3	3–5	2–5	1–5
Hidenori Munekata (JPN)	5–1	5–1	—	5–3	4–5	5–2	5–3
Emerson Segui (PHI)	5–1	3–5	3–5	—	2–5	1–5	0–5
Seo Sung-jun (KOR)	5–2	5–3	5–4	5–2	—	5–4	5–2
Abbas Sheikholeslami (IRI)	5–2	5–2	2–5	5–1	4–5	—	1–5
Yan Weidong (CHN)	5–0	5–1	3–5	5–0	2–5	5–1	—

==== Pool D ====
Athlete	PHI	KOR	HKG	THA	JPN	UZB	CHN
Richard de Guzman (PHI)	—	1–5	5–1	2–5	1–5	1–5	5–4
Ko Young-tae (KOR)	5–1	—	5–3	5–1	5–3	5–3	5–3
Lee Wing Keung (HKG)	1–5	3–5	—	3–5	4–5	1–5	3–5
Sares Limkangwanmongkol (THA)	5–2	1–5	5–3	—	5–3	5–4	5–3
Shinsuke Senda (JPN)	5–1	3–5	5–4	3–5	—	4–5	3–5
Vadim Sossine (UZB)	5–1	3–5	5–1	4–5	5–4	—	5–4
Zhang Lin (CHN)	4–5	3–5	5–3	3–5	5–3	4–5	—

==== Pool E ====
Athlete	HKG	KOR	TPE	PHI	THA	KAZ	UZB
Kong Wai Kei (HKG)	—	5–3	3–5	1–5	5–3	0–5	4–5
Lee Hyun-soo (KOR)	3–5	—	5–4	1–5	5–2	5–4	5–2
Lee Kuan-yi (TPE)	5–3	4–5	—	4–5	3–5	5–2	5–0
Walbert Mendoza (PHI)	5–1	5–1	5–4	—	5–2	4–5	5–2
Somkhit Phongyoo (THA)	3–5	2–5	5–3	2–5	—	2–5	5–4
Igor Tsel (KAZ)	5–0	4–5	2–5	5–4	5–2	—	5–1
Erkinjon Yuldashev (UZB)	5–4	2–5	0–5	2–5	4–5	1–5	—

==== Summary ====
Rank	Pool	Athlete	W	L	W/M	TD	TF
1	D	Ko Young-tae (KOR)	6	0	1.000	+16	30
2	C	Seo Sung-jun (KOR)	6	0	1.000	+13	30
3	B	Guo Rong (CHN)	5	0	1.000	+11	25
4	A	Masaki Shimoda (JPN)	5	0	1.000	+10	25
5	C	Hidenori Munekata (JPN)	5	1	0.833	+14	29
5	E	Walbert Mendoza (PHI)	5	1	0.833	+14	29
7	D	Sares Limkangwanmongkol (THA)	5	1	0.833	+6	26
8	A	Viktor Yegorov (KAZ)	4	1	0.800	+12	23
9	C	Yan Weidong (CHN)	4	2	0.667	+13	25
10	E	Igor Tsel (KAZ)	4	2	0.667	+9	26
11	D	Vadim Sossine (UZB)	4	2	0.667	+7	27
12	E	Lee Hyun-soo (KOR)	4	2	0.667	+2	24
13	B	Peyman Fakhri (IRI)	3	2	0.600	+8	22
14	A	Huang Tzu-hua (TPE)	3	2	0.600	+4	19
15	B	Serik Raimbekov (KAZ)	3	2	0.600	+2	21
16	E	Lee Kuan-yi (TPE)	3	3	0.500	+6	26
17	C	Abbas Sheikholeslami (IRI)	3	3	0.500	+2	22
18	B	Aleksey Savinkov (UZB)	2	3	0.400	−2	19
19	A	Kong Chi Chung (HKG)	2	3	0.400	−6	15
20	D	Zhang Lin (CHN)	2	4	0.333	−2	24
21	D	Shinsuke Senda (JPN)	2	4	0.333	−2	23
22	E	Somkhit Phongyoo (THA)	2	4	0.333	−8	19
23	E	Kong Wai Kei (HKG)	2	4	0.333	−8	18
24	D	Richard de Guzman (PHI)	2	4	0.333	−10	15
25	B	Huang Chen-wei (TPE)	1	4	0.200	−6	16
26	A	Amir Mohaymen Rahimi (IRI)	1	4	0.200	−8	14
27	B	Tareq Faisal (KUW)	1	4	0.200	−13	11
28	C	Emerson Segui (PHI)	1	5	0.167	−12	14
29	E	Erkinjon Yuldashev (UZB)	1	5	0.167	−15	14
30	C	Sirawut Chuensiwa (THA)	1	5	0.167	−15	13
31	C	Abdul Al-Fadhli (KUW)	1	5	0.167	−15	11
32	A	Abdulkarim Al-Shamlan (KUW)	0	5	0.000	−12	13
33	D	Lee Wing Keung (HKG)	0	6	0.000	−15	15

=== Knockout round ===
==== Finals ====
Semifinals
1	Ko Young-tae (KOR)	15
20	Zhang Lin (CHN)	14
3	Guo Rong (CHN)	15
26	Amir Mohaymen Rahimi (IRI)	6

Final
1	Ko Young-tae (KOR)	13
3	Guo Rong (CHN)	15
Bronze medal match
20	Zhang Lin (CHN)	15
26	Amir Mohaymen Rahimi (IRI)	4

==== Section 1 ====
Round of 64
33	Lee Wing Keung (HKG)	9
32	Abdulkarim Al-Shamlan (KUW)	15

Round of 32
1	Ko Young-tae (KOR)	15
32	Abdulkarim Al-Shamlan (KUW)	9
17	Abbas Sheikholeslami (IRI)	15
16	Lee Kuan-yi (TPE)	7
9	Yan Weidong (CHN)	13
24	Richard de Guzman (PHI)	15
25	Huang Chen-wei (TPE)	11
8	Viktor Yegorov (KAZ)	15

Round of 16
1	Ko Young-tae (KOR)	15
17	Abbas Sheikholeslami (IRI)	11
24	Richard de Guzman (PHI)	14
8	Viktor Yegorov (KAZ)	15

Quarterfinals
1	Ko Young-tae (KOR)	15
8	Viktor Yegorov (KAZ)	7

==== Section 2 ====
Round of 64

Round of 32
5	Hidenori Munekata (JPN)	15
28	Emerson Segui (PHI)	12
21	Shinsuke Senda (JPN)	13
12	Lee Hyun-soo (KOR)	15
13	Peyman Fakhri (IRI)	14
20	Zhang Lin (CHN)	15
29	Erkinjon Yuldashev (UZB)	8
4	Masaki Shimoda (JPN)	15

Round of 16
5	Hidenori Munekata (JPN)	12
12	Lee Hyun-soo (KOR)	15
20	Zhang Lin (CHN)	15
4	Masaki Shimoda (JPN)	10

Quarterfinals
12	Lee Hyun-soo (KOR)	14
20	Zhang Lin (CHN)	15

==== Section 3 ====
Round of 64

Round of 32
3	Guo Rong (CHN)	15
30	Sirawut Chuensiwa (THA)	4
19	Kong Chi Chung (HKG)	7
14	Huang Tzu-hua (TPE)	15
11	Vadim Sossine (UZB)	15
22	Somkhit Phongyoo (THA)	13
27	Tareq Faisal (KUW)	10
6	Walbert Mendoza (PHI)	15

Round of 16
3	Guo Rong (CHN)	15
14	Huang Tzu-hua (TPE)	2
11	Vadim Sossine (UZB)	15
6	Walbert Mendoza (PHI)	14

Quarterfinals
3	Guo Rong (CHN)	15
11	Vadim Sossine (UZB)	12

==== Section 4 ====
Round of 64

Round of 32
7	Sares Limkangwanmongkol (THA)	13
26	Amir Mohaymen Rahimi (IRI)	15
23	Kong Wai Kei (HKG)	5
10	Igor Tsel (KAZ)	15
15	Serik Raimbekov (KAZ)	15
18	Aleksey Savinkov (UZB)	8
31	Abdul Al-Fadhli (KUW)	8
2	Seo Sung-jun (KOR)	15

Round of 16
26	Amir Mohaymen Rahimi (IRI)	15
10	Igor Tsel (KAZ)	11
15	Serik Raimbekov (KAZ)	7
2	Seo Sung-jun (KOR)	15

Quarterfinals
26	Amir Mohaymen Rahimi (IRI)	15
2	Seo Sung-jun (KOR)	14
