= Fencing at the 1998 Asian Games – Men's team sabre =

Men's team sabre at the 1998 Asian Games
- Venue: Thammasat Gymnasium 4
- Date: 18 December 1998
- Nations: 11

Medalists
gold medal	South Korea; Kim Doo-hong, Ko Young-tae, Lee Hyun-soo, Seo Sung-jun
silver medal	China; Guo Rong, Liu Yuntao, Yan Weidong, Zhang Lin
bronze medal	Iran; Peyman Fakhri, Mohammad Mirmohammadi, Amir Mohaymen Rahimi, Abbas Sheikholeslami

The men's team sabre competition at the 1998 Asian Games in Bangkok, Thailand was held on 18 December 1998 at the Thammasat Gymnasium 4, Thammasat University. The sabre weapon is for thrusting and cutting with both the cutting edge and the back of the blade.

The field of eleven teams with three or four fencers competed in a single-elimination tournament to determine the medal winners. Semifinal losers proceeded to a bronze medal match. Each match features the three fencers on each team competing in a round-robin, with 9 three-minute bouts to 5 points; the winning team is the one that reaches 45 total points first or is leading after the end of the nine bouts.

South Korea (Kim Doo-hong, Ko Young-tae, Lee Hyun-soo and Seo Sung-jun) won the gold medal after beating China (Guo Rong, Liu Yuntao, Yan Weidong and Zhang Lin) in the final 45-44. Iran took the bronze medal by defeating Kazakhstan 45-43 in the 3rd place match.

== Schedule ==
All times are Indochina Time (UTC+07:00)

Date	Time	Event
Friday, 18 December 1998	09:00	Preliminaries
Friday, 18 December 1998	15:00	Finals

== Results ==
Round of 16
9	Thailand	32
8	Chinese Taipei	45
11	Hong Kong	30
6	Philippines	45
7	Japan	45
10	Kuwait	31

Quarterfinals
1	China	45
8	Chinese Taipei	19
5	Uzbekistan	38
4	Iran	45
3	Kazakhstan	45
6	Philippines	37
7	Japan	27
2	South Korea	45

Semifinals
1	China	45
4	Iran	30
3	Kazakhstan	24
2	South Korea	45

Final
1	China	44
2	South Korea	45
Bronze medal match
4	Iran	45
3	Kazakhstan	43
