= Fencing at the 1998 Asian Games – Women's individual foil =

Women's individual foil at the 1998 Asian Games
- Venue: Thammasat Gymnasium 4
- Date: 9 December 1998
- Competitors: 23 from 8 nations

Medalists
gold medal	Xiao Aihua	China
silver medal	Lim Mi-kyung	South Korea
bronze medal	Du Yunjie	China

The women's individual foil competition at the 1998 Asian Games in Bangkok was held on 9 December 1998 at the Thammasat Gymnasium 4.

== Schedule ==
All times are Indochina Time (UTC+07:00)

Date	Time	Event
Wednesday, 9 December 1998	09:00	Preliminaries
Wednesday, 9 December 1998	16:00	Finals

== Results ==
=== Round of pools ===
==== Pool A ====
Athlete	PHI	PRK	KAZ	JPN	THA	CHN
Roberta Gonzalez (PHI)	—	2–5	5–2	2–5	5–2	0–5
Kim Hye-yong (PRK)	5–2	—	5–2	5–3	5–0	0–5
Yuliya Khugayeva (KAZ)	2–5	2–5	—	0–5	5–2	3–5
Masako Kobayashi (JPN)	5–2	3–5	5–0	—	5–0	1–5
Ampa Usaha (THA)	2–5	0–5	2–5	0–5	—	0–5
Xiao Aihua (CHN)	5–0	5–0	5–3	5–1	5–0	—

==== Pool B ====
Athlete	KAZ	PHI	KOR	THA	INA	CHN
Sabina Bazarbayeva (KAZ)	—	4–5	0–5	5–0	5–2	4–5
Marinella Belgado (PHI)	5–4	—	0–5	5–3	2–5	2–5
Chun Mi-kyung (KOR)	5–0	5–0	—	5–1	5–1	4–5
Pariyanuch Na Ta (THA)	0–5	3–5	1–5	—	0–5	0–5
Fabiola Tirza Paulany Ratu (INA)	2–5	5–2	1–5	5–0	—	3–5
Wang Huifeng (CHN)	5–4	5–2	5–4	5–0	5–3	—

==== Pool C ====
Athlete	JPN	KOR	PHI	PRK	KAZ	INA
Yuko Arai (JPN)	—	2–5	5–1	5–2	5–2	5–0
Lim Mi-kyung (KOR)	5–2	—	5–2	5–2	5–4	5–0
Mary Nokom (PHI)	1–5	2–5	—	2–5	1–5	2–5
Ryo Jong-ran (PRK)	2–5	2–5	5–2	—	3–5	5–3
Nellya Sevostyanova (KAZ)	2–5	4–5	5–1	5–3	—	5–2
Christina Timisela (INA)	0–5	0–5	5–2	3–5	2–5	—

==== Pool D ====
Athlete	THA	CHN	PRK	KOR	JPN
Woranud Boonmahanak (THA)	—	3–5	2–5	1–5	1–5
Du Yunjie (CHN)	5–3	—	4–5	5–4	0–5
Kim Hui-ran (PRK)	5–2	5–4	—	0–5	0–5
Lee Tae-hee (KOR)	5–1	4–5	5–0	—	5–0
Miwako Shimada (JPN)	5–1	5–0	5–0	0–5	—

==== Summary ====
Rank	Pool	Athlete	W	L	W/M	TD	TF
1	A	Xiao Aihua (CHN)	5	0	1.000	+21	25
2	C	Lim Mi-kyung (KOR)	5	0	1.000	+15	25
3	B	Wang Huifeng (CHN)	5	0	1.000	+12	25
4	B	Chun Mi-kyung (KOR)	4	1	0.800	+17	24
5	C	Yuko Arai (JPN)	4	1	0.800	+12	22
6	A	Kim Hye-yong (PRK)	4	1	0.800	+8	20
7	D	Lee Tae-hee (KOR)	3	1	0.750	+13	19
8	D	Miwako Shimada (JPN)	3	1	0.750	+9	15
9	A	Masako Kobayashi (JPN)	3	2	0.600	+7	19
10	C	Nellya Sevostyanova (KAZ)	3	2	0.600	+5	21
11	D	Du Yunjie (CHN)	2	2	0.500	−3	14
12	D	Kim Hui-ran (PRK)	2	2	0.500	−6	10
13	B	Sabina Bazarbayeva (KAZ)	2	3	0.400	+1	18
14	B	Fabiola Tirza Paulany Ratu (INA)	2	3	0.400	−1	16
15	C	Ryo Jong-ran (PRK)	2	3	0.400	−3	17
16	A	Roberta Gonzalez (PHI)	2	3	0.400	−5	14
17	B	Marinella Belgado (PHI)	2	3	0.400	−8	14
18	A	Yuliya Khugayeva (KAZ)	1	4	0.200	−10	12
19	C	Christina Timisela (INA)	1	4	0.200	−12	10
20	D	Woranud Boonmahanak (THA)	0	4	0.000	−13	7
21	C	Mary Nokom (PHI)	0	5	0.000	−17	8
22	A	Ampa Usaha (THA)	0	5	0.000	−21	4
22	B	Pariyanuch Na Ta (THA)	0	5	0.000	−21	4

=== Knockout round ===
==== Finals ====
Final
1	Xiao Aihua (CHN)	15
2	Lim Mi-kyung (KOR)	5

Bronze medal match
5	Chun Mi-kyung (KOR)	13
11	Du Yunjie (CHN)	14

==== Top half ====
Round of 32
17	Marinella Belgado (PHI)	15
16	Roberta Gonzalez (PHI)	10
21	Mary Nokom (PHI)	15
12	Kim Hui-ran (PRK)	4
13	Sabina Bazarbayeva (KAZ)	15
20	Woranud Boonmahanak (THA)	2

Round of 16
1	Xiao Aihua (CHN)	15
17	Marinella Belgado (PHI)	8
9	Masako Kobayashi (JPN)	8
8	Miwako Shimada (JPN)	15
5	Yuko Arai (JPN)	15
21	Mary Nokom (PHI)	3
13	Sabina Bazarbayeva (KAZ)	5
4	Chun Mi-kyung (KOR)	15

Quarterfinals
1	Xiao Aihua (CHN)	15
8	Miwako Shimada (JPN)	7
5	Yuko Arai (JPN)	14
4	Chun Mi-kyung (KOR)	15

Semifinals
1	Xiao Aihua (CHN)	15
5	Chun Mi-kyung (KOR)	10

==== Bottom half ====
Round of 32
19	Christina Timisela (INA)	15
14	Fabiola Tirza Paulany Ratu (INA)	5
11	Du Yunjie (CHN)	15
22	Ampa Usaha (THA)	7
23	Pariyanuch Na Ta (THA)	6
10	Nellya Sevostyanova (KAZ)	15
15	Ryo Jong-ran (PRK)	8
18	Yuliya Khugayeva (KAZ)	15

Round of 16
3	Wang Huifeng (CHN)	15
19	Christina Timisela (INA)	8
11	Du Yunjie (CHN)	15
6	Kim Hye-yong (PRK)	6
7	Lee Tae-hee (KOR)	15
10	Nellya Sevostyanova (KAZ)	2
18	Yuliya Khugayeva (KAZ)	11
2	Lim Mi-kyung (KOR)	15

Quarterfinals
3	Wang Huifeng (CHN)	3
11	Du Yunjie (CHN)	15
7	Lee Tae-hee (KOR)	9
2	Lim Mi-kyung (KOR)	15

Semifinals
11	Du Yunjie (CHN)	13
2	Lim Mi-kyung (KOR)	15
