= Fencing at the 1974 Asian Games =

- Venue: Aryamehr Sport Complex
- Dates: 3–13 September 1974
- Nations: 8

Fencing at the 1974 Asian Games was held in Tehran, Iran between 3 and 13 September 1974.

== Medalists ==
=== Men ===
Event	Gold	Silver	Bronze
Individual épée	Makoto Ishikawa; Japan	Pirouz Adamiat; Iran	Mitsuyasu Aida; Japan
Team épée	Iran; Pirouz Adamiat; Parviz Almasi; Sarkis Assadourian; Ali Asghar Pashapour; Esfandiar Zarnegar	Japan; Mitsuyasu Aida; Makoto Ishikawa	China; Gao Weilin; Guo Yineng; Tao Jinhan; Tong Wei
Individual foil	Toshio Jingu; Japan	Ali Asghar Pashapour; Iran	Masaya Fukuda; Japan
Team foil	Japan; Masaya Fukuda; Toshio Jingu	South Korea; Kim Doo-kyung; Kim Jung-il; Kim Kuk-hyun; Shin Dong-seok; Sung Ki-man	Iran; Ahmad Akbari; Parviz Almasi; Sarkis Assadourian; Ali Asghar Pashapour; Kioumars Tolouei
Individual sabre	Atsushi Akiho; Japan	Abdolhamid Fathi; Iran	Manouchehr Shafaei; Iran
Team sabre	Iran; Ahmad Akbari; Ahmad Eskandarpour; Abdolhamid Fathi; Esmaeil Pashapour; Manouchehr Shafaei	Japan; Atsushi Akiho; Masaya Fukuda; Hideaki Kamei; Hiroshi Nakajima	China; Liu Mao; Shen Changjie; Wang Pinzhang; Zhang Baoren

=== Women ===
Event	Gold	Silver	Bronze
Individual foil	Hiroko Kamada; Japan	Mahvash Shafaei; Iran	Giti Mohebban; Iran
Team foil	Iran; Maryam Achak; Jila Almasi; Giti Mohebban; Mahvash Shafaei; Maryam Shariatzadeh	Japan; Yukari Kajihara; Hiroko Kamada	Israel; Nurit Carmi; Nili Drori; Inbar Guy; Orli Schreiber

== Medal table ==
Rank	Nation	Gold	Silver	Bronze	Total
1	Japan (JPN)	5	3	2	10
2	Iran (IRN)	3	4	3	10
3	South Korea (KOR)	0	1	0	1
4	China (CHN)	0	0	2	2
5	Israel (ISR)	0	0	1	1
Totals (5 entries)		8	8	8	24

== Participating nations ==
- China
- Hong Kong
- Iran (17)
- Israel
- Japan
- North Korea
- South Korea
- Thailand
