= Fencing at the 1978 Asian Games =

- Venue: International School
- Dates: 10–18 December 1978

Fencing at the 1978 Asian Games was held in Bangkok, Thailand in December 1978.

== Medalists ==
=== Men ===
Event	Gold	Silver	Bronze
Individual épée	Toshiaki Araki; Japan	Kim Kuk-hyun; South Korea	Sei Murata; Japan
Team épée	China; Cui Yining; Guo Dongsheng; He Zhiping; Tan Zhihui	Japan; Toshiaki Araki; Hideyuki Itakura; Sei Murata; Takahiro Yamaguchi	South Korea; Kim Heon-su; Kim Kuk-hyun; Kook Choong-kum; Shin Dong-seok
Individual foil	Kiyoshi Otsuka; Japan	Wang Fuyun; China	Hideyuki Itakura; Japan
Team foil	South Korea; Cha Yul; Kim Doo-kyung; Kim Heon-su; Kim Kuk-hyun	China; Qiu Hongjun; Wang Fuyun; Wu Fujing; Xu Jianzhong	Japan; Hideyuki Itakura; Takao Masuoka; Shiro Toshima; Kenichi Umezawa
Individual sabre	Wang Ruiji; China	Tadashi Kawamura; Japan	Cha Yul; South Korea
Team sabre	Japan; Atsushi Akiho; Ryokichi Fukushima; Tadashi Kawamura; Kiyoshi Otsuka	China; Chen Jinchu; Wang Ruiji; Yang Shisheng; Zhang Baoren	South Korea; Cha Yul; Cho Jae-bong; Kim Doo-kyung; Kim Kuk-hyun

=== Women ===
Event	Gold	Silver	Bronze
Individual foil	Luan Jujie; China	Zhu Qingyuan; China	Masako Yoshioka; Japan
Team foil	China; Hu Yubao; Luan Jujie; Su Lianfeng; Zhu Qingyuan	Japan; Yukari Itakura; Machiko Ito; Hiroko Kawamura; Masako Yoshioka	Indonesia; Rita Piri Hehanusa; Wahyu Hertati; Silvia Koeswandi; Slamet Poerawinata

== Medal table ==
Rank	Nation	Gold	Silver	Bronze	Total
1	China (CHN)	4	4	0	8
2	Japan (JPN)	3	3	4	10
3	South Korea (KOR)	1	1	3	5
4	Indonesia (INA)	0	0	1	1
Totals (4 entries)		8	8	8	24
