= Shafaei =

Shafaei (Persian: شَفاعی) is a Persian surname. Notable people with the surname include:

- Mahvash Shafaei (born 1956), Iranian fencer, relative of Manouchehr
- Manouchehr Shafaei (born 1949), Iranian fencer, human rights activist, and journalist
