= Wang Zhiming =

Wang Zhiming may refer to:

- Wang Zhiming (pastor) (1907–1973), Chinese pastor and martyr
- Wang Zhiming (fencer) (born 1964), Chinese fencer
- Wang Zhiming (athlete), Chinese field athlete

== See also ==
- Wang Zhimin, (born 1957), Chinese politician
- Wang Ziming
