= Ali Asghar Pashapour =

Iranian fencer (born 1951)

Personal information
- Full name: Ali Asghar Pashapour Alamdari
- Born: 24 October 1951 (age 74)

Sport
- Sport: Fencing
Medal record
Men's fencing
Representing Iran
Asian Games
Gold medal – first place	1974 Tehran	Team épée
Silver medal – second place	1974 Tehran	Individual foil
Bronze medal – third place	1974 Tehran	Team foil

Ali Asghar Pashapour Alamdari (Persian: علی اصغر پاشاپور علمداری; born 24 October 1951) is an Iranian fencer. He competed at the 1972 and 1976 Summer Olympics.

He also won three medals at the 1974 Asian Games in Tehran, he is a cousin of Mahvash and Manouchehr Shafaei.
