= Kiritani =

Kiritani (Japanese: 桐谷) is a Japanese surname.

Notable people with this surname include:

- Kenta Kiritani (born 1980), Japanese actor
- Mirei Kiritani (born 1989), Japanese actress
- Nona Kiritani (born 1967), Japanese fencer
