= Maryam Achak =

Iranian fencer (born 1947)

Personal information
- Born: 4 February 1947 (age 79)

Sport
- Sport: Fencing
Medal record
Women's fencing
Representing Iran
Asian Games
Gold medal – first place	1974 Tehran	Team foil

Maryam Achak (Persian: مریم آچاك; born 4 February 1947) is an Iranian fencer. She competed in the women's team foil event at the 1976 Summer Olympics.

== See also ==
- List of Asian Games medalists in fencing
