= Giti Mohebban =

Iranian fencer (born 1950)

Personal information
- Born: 21 March 1950 (age 76) Isfahan, Iran

Sport
- Sport: Fencing
Medal record
Women's fencing
Representing Iran
Asian Games
| Gold medal – first place | 1974 Tehran | Team foil |
| Bronze medal – third place | 1974 Tehran | Individual foil |

Giti Mohebban (Persian: گیتی محبان; born 21 March 1950) is an Iranian fencer. She competed in the women's individual and team foil events at the 1976 Summer Olympics.

== See also ==
- List of Asian Games medalists in fencing
