= Hiroko Kamada =

Japanese fencer (born 1953)

Personal information
- Born: 22 March 1953 (age 73)

Sport
- Sport: Fencing

Hiroko Kamada (鎌田 弘子, Kamada Hiroko; born 22 March 1953) is a Japanese fencer. She competed in the women's team foil event at the 1976 Summer Olympics.

== See also ==
- List of Asian Games medalists in fencing
