= Luan Jujie =

Chinese-born Canadian fencer (born 1958)

Personal information
- Nationality: Chinese (before 1994); Canadian (since 1994)
- Born: 14 July 1958 (age 68) Nanjing, People’s Republic of China

Sport
- Sport: Fencing
Medal record
Women's fencing
Representing China
Olympic Games
Gold medal – first place	1984 Los Angeles	Foil
World Championships
Silver medal – second place	1981 Clermont-Ferrand	Individual foil
Bronze medal – third place	1983 Vienna	Individual foil
Bronze medal – third place	1987 Lausanne	Individual foil
Asian Games
Gold medal – first place	1978 Bangkok	Individual foil
Gold medal – first place	1978 Bangkok	Team foil
Gold medal – first place	1986 Seoul	Team foil
Silver medal – second place	1986 Seoul	Individual foil
Summer Universiade
Gold medal – first place	1983 Edmonton	Team foil
Gold medal – first place	1985 Kobe	Individual foil

Luan Jujie (Chinese: 栾菊杰; pinyin: Luán Jújié; born 14 July 1958) is a Chinese-born Canadian fencer, born in Nanjing, China. At the 1984 Summer Olympics in Los Angeles, she became the first Chinese (and non-European) athlete to win the gold medal in fencing. Since moving to Edmonton, Alberta, Canada in 1985, she has become a Canadian citizen. At the age of 50, Luan represented Canada at the 2008 Summer Olympics. She has also participated in the 1988 and 2000 Summer Olympics.

== Career ==
Being an outstanding athlete in her youth, she had already done well in track and badminton before switching to fencing. She started fencing at the age of 17 and in no time joined the national team in the same year. Luan quickly rose in the international ranking capturing 2nd in the 1978 World Junior Championships (first Asian athlete to enter since 1901) and golds at the 1979 Chinese National Games, 1983 International Women's Fencing Tournament (first East Asian fencer to ever win an international event) and 1984 World Championships. She competed for the Chinese National Fencing Team in the 1984 Summer Olympics in Los Angeles when she was 26 years old and she became the first East Asian person to ever win an Olympic Gold in the sport of fencing. She also competed in the 1988 Summer Olympics for China.

Throughout her fencing career, she was noted for her toughness, once even continuing a match after being stabbed in the arm by a broken foil. She also struggled with kidney problems throughout her career.

Luan eventually moved to Edmonton, Alberta. She first came to Edmonton for the 1983 Summer Universiade and "fell in love with the city" so much that she moved to Edmonton in 1989 where she had three children. She started teaching at the Edmonton Fencing Club and was fundamental in the club's growth expanding it from a mere 40 members in 1989 to over 400 members today. She became a Canadian citizen in 1994.

She continued competing in fencing events in Canada and in the Fencing World Cup winning 4 Canadian National Championships in 1995, 1996, 1997 and 1999. In 2000, she qualified for her third Olympic Games in Sydney, Australia despite her age at the time of 42. She eventually lost in the preliminary rounds. She actively trained at the EFC and fenced in numerous competitions in hopes of gaining a berth on the 2008 Canadian Olympic team, which she succeeded in accomplishing.

Back in China, she is still often studied in textbooks, and has even had a movie made about her life. In 1999 she was named one of China's top 35 sports stars since the founding of the People's Republic of China in 1949.

Luan qualified for the 2008 Beijing Olympics as a Canadian. On 11 August 2008, Jujie won her first round 13–9 win against the higher ranked Tunisian fencer Inès Boubakri, but ultimately had a 15–7 loss to Hungary's Aida Mohamed, 32, who was ranked seventh in the world.

In 2018, Luan placed first at the World Veteran Championships 60+ age group held in Livorno, Italy.
