= Ye Lin =

Chinese fencer (born 1972)

Personal information
- Born: 27 November 1972 (age 53)
- Height: 1.64 m (5 ft 5 in)
- Weight: 58 kg (128 lb)

Sport
- Sport: Fencing
Medal record
Representing China
Asian Games
Gold medal – first place	1994 Hiroshima	Team foil

Ye Lin (Chinese: 葉 琳; born 27 November 1972) is a Chinese fencer. She competed in the women's team foil event at the 1992 Summer Olympics and finished in sixth place.
