= Lee Hyo-kun =

South Korean fencer and fencing coach

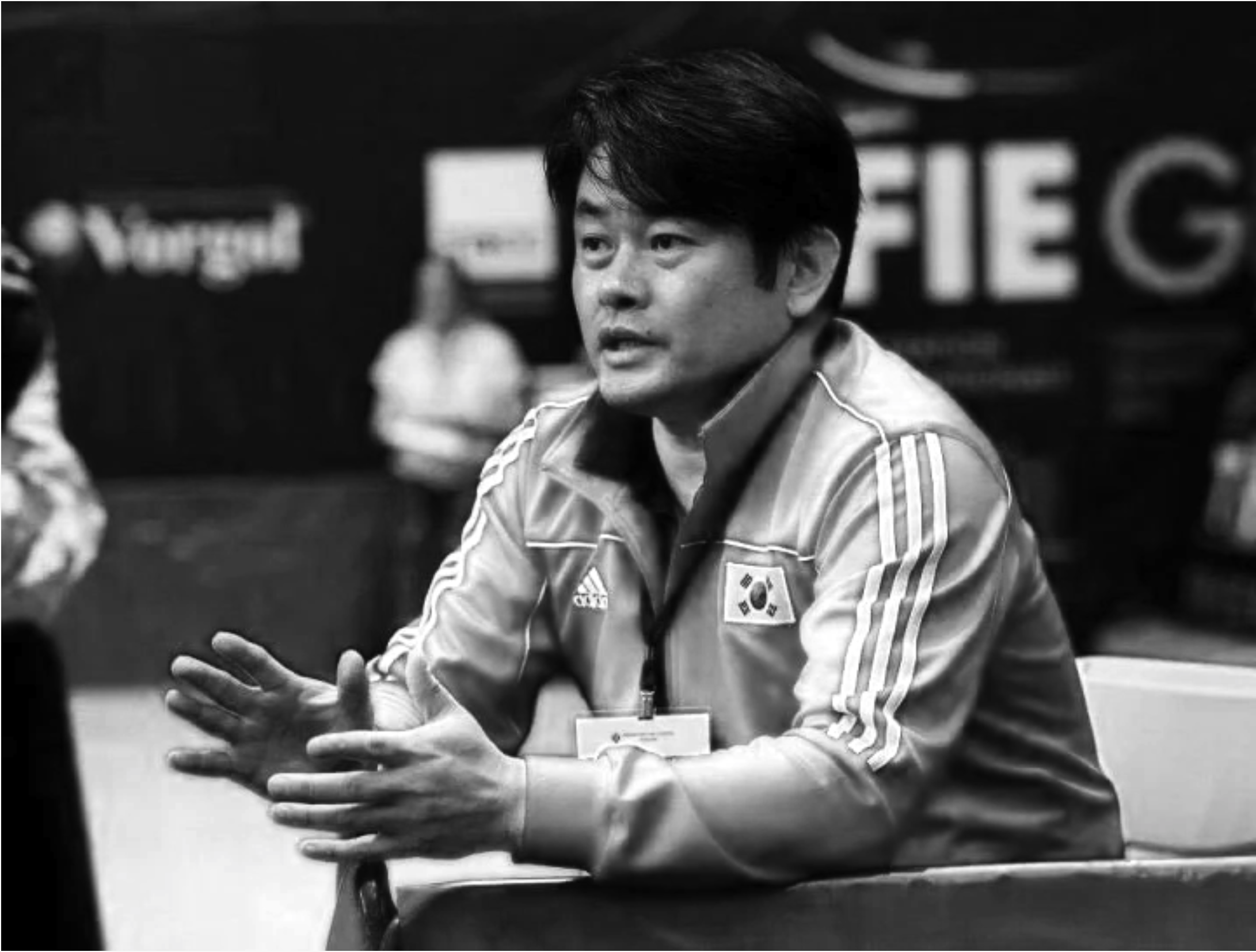
- Lee Hyo-kun during a fencing coaching session

Personal information
- Native name: 이효근
- Nationality: South Korean
- Born: 7 August 1967 (age 58) Seoul, South Korea
- Education: Korea National Sport University
- Height: 173 cm (5 ft 8 in)
- Weight: 70 kg (154 lb)

Sport
- Country: South Korea
- Sport: Fencing
- Event: Sabre
- Club: Seoul Subway Corporation
- Retired: 1996
- Now coaching: Globus Fencing Academy

Achievements and titles
- Olympic finals: 1988 Summer Olympics; 1996 Summer Olympics
Medal record
Men's fencing
Representing South Korea
Asian Games
| Silver medal – second place | 1990 Beijing | Team sabre |
| Silver medal – second place | 1994 Hiroshima | Individual sabre |
| Silver medal – second place | 1994 Hiroshima | Team sabre |
Asian Fencing Championships
| Gold medal – first place | 1989 China | Team sabre |
| Silver medal – second place | 1991 Malaysia | Team sabre |
| Bronze medal – third place | 1991 Malaysia | Individual sabre |
| Gold medal – first place | 1993 Japan | Team sabre |

Lee Hyo-kun (Korean: 이효근; Hanja: 李孝根; born 7 August 1967), also romanized as Lee Hyo-Geun, Lee Hyo Kun and Hyo Kun Lee, is a South Korean former fencer and fencing coach. He competed for South Korea in men's sabre fencing at the 1988 Summer Olympics and the 1996 Summer Olympics.

Lee was selected for the South Korean men's sabre national team while attending Hongik High School and competed internationally for South Korea for about 12 years. After his competitive career, he became a fencing coach. He was the founding coach of the fencing team at Dong-eui University and has been credited in Korean media with helping establish sabre fencing in Busan. He later served as a coach for South Korea's national sabre teams. In 2023, WFAA reported that he was head coach of Globus Fencing Academy in North Texas.

== Early life and education ==
Lee was born in Seoul, South Korea, in 1967. He was educated in Seoul, graduating from Samseon Elementary School in 1980, Hongik Middle School in 1983 and Hongik High School in 1986. He entered Korea National Sport University in 1986 and graduated on 24 February 1990, the same date on which he obtained a second-grade secondary school teacher certification.

Lee entered the graduate school of Korea National Sport University on 1 March 1990 and completed his graduate studies on 25 February 1997.

== Competitive career ==
Lee was selected for the South Korean men's sabre national team in October 1984 while attending Hongik High School. He remained a member of the national team until November 1996 and competed internationally for South Korea for about 12 years.

Lee represented South Korea at the 1988 Summer Olympics in Seoul, competing in men's team sabre, and at the 1996 Summer Olympics in Atlanta, competing in men's individual sabre and men's team sabre. At the Asian Games, he won silver medals in team sabre at the 1990 Asian Games in Beijing and in both individual sabre and team sabre at the 1994 Asian Games in Hiroshima.

Lee also competed in several junior, world, university and continental competitions. His recorded results include team gold medals at the 1989 and 1993 Asian Fencing Championships, a team silver medal and individual bronze medal at the 1991 Asian Fencing Championships, and appearances at World Junior Championships, World Championships and the Universiade.

== Military service and early professional career ==
Lee enlisted in the Korea Armed Forces Athletic Corps on 9 March 1990 and was discharged on 28 May 1992. Later that year, he joined Seoul Subway Corporation, where he was affiliated during his fencing career. He left Seoul Subway Corporation on 1 March 2000.

== Coaching and administrative career ==
Lee began his coaching career with South Korea's national sabre program and was appointed coach of the South Korean women's national sabre team on 1 November 1999. On 1 December 2000, he became fencing coach at Dong-eui University.

Korean media later described Lee and Kim Gye-hwan as pioneers of sabre fencing in Busan, reporting that before their work in the region there had been no sabre fencers or sabre coaches in Busan. Lee became head coach when Dong-eui University founded its fencing team, and within several years the team became one of the leading university sabre programs in South Korea. Busan Ilbo reported in 2013 that Lee had led the Dong-eui University fencing team since its founding and that the team won consecutive team titles at the National Sports Festival in 2003 and 2004.

Newsis reported that Lee helped plant the roots of sabre fencing in Busan by founding teams at Yangun Middle School and Shindo High School before developing the Dong-eui University team. Dong-eui University later became known as a major training base for South Korean sabre fencing, producing national-team fencers including Oh Eun-seok, Gu Bon-gil, Kim Jun-ho, Choi Su-yeon and Yoon Ji-su.

Lee was appointed competition director of the Korea University Fencing Federation on 21 April 2009. In January 2015, he became a coach of the South Korean men's national sabre team. Dong-eui University reported that he participated in the 2016 Summer Olympics as a South Korean sabre coach. His career record states that a sabre athlete he coached won a bronze medal at the 2016 Rio Olympics.

In January 2017, Lee became a coach of the South Korean women's national sabre team. Newsis also reported that he had served as a coach of the South Korean women's national sabre team. Lee remained Dong-eui University's fencing coach until 2017, retiring from the position in December of that year. His career record states that he introduced Busan's first sabre fencing program at Dong-eui University.

In 2018, Lee moved to the United States, where he founded Globus Fencing Academy and became its head coach. WFAA reported in 2023 that he was head coach of Globus Fencing Academy in North Texas. His career record states that the academy has regularly produced students admitted to Ivy League and other selective universities in the United States.

== Awards and qualifications ==
- 3 December 1990: Received the Girin Medal of the Order of Sport Merit.
- 25 January 1991: Received the Korean Fencing Federation Best Athlete Award.
- 22 December 1997: Obtained a first-class sports instructor qualification.
- 21 February 2003: Received a Prime Minister's Commendation for service as secretary-general of the Asia-Pacific Games for the Disabled.
- 16 February 2004: Received the Korean Fencing Federation Best Coach Award.
- 28 February 2005: Received the Busan Sports Award for excellence in coaching.
- 25 March 2005: Received the Baengma Medal of the Order of Sport Merit.
- 20 December 2006: Received a coaching award from the Busan Metropolitan Sports Instructors Association.

== International competition record ==
| Year | Competition | Location | Event / result |
|---|---|---|---|
| 1985 | World Junior Championships | Netherlands | Competed |
| 1986 | World Junior Championships | Germany | Competed |
| 1987 | World Junior Championships | Brazil | Competed |
| 1987 | World Championships | Switzerland | Competed |
| 1987 | Universiade | Yugoslavia | Competed |
| 1988 | 1988 Summer Olympics | Seoul, South Korea | Men's team sabre, 11th |
| 1989 | World Championships | United States | Competed |
| 1989 | Asian Fencing Championships | China | Team sabre, 1st |
| 1990 | World Championships | France | Competed |
| 1990 | 1990 Asian Games | Beijing, China | Team sabre, silver medal |
| 1991 | World Championships | Hungary | Competed |
| 1991 | Asian Fencing Championships | Malaysia | Team sabre, 2nd; individual sabre, 3rd |
| 1993 | World Championships | Germany | Competed |
| 1993 | Asian Fencing Championships | Japan | Team sabre, 1st |
| 1994 | 1994 Asian Games | Hiroshima, Japan | Individual sabre, silver medal; team sabre, silver medal |
| 1996 | 1996 Summer Olympics | Atlanta, United States | Men's individual sabre, 38th; men's team sabre, 11th |
