= Pirouz Adamiat =

Iranian fencer (born 1949)

Personal information
- Born: 19 June 1949 (age 77)

Sport
- Sport: Fencing
Medal record
Men's fencing
Representing Iran
Asian Games
Gold medal – first place	1974 Tehran	Team épée
Silver medal – second place	1974 Tehran	Individual épée

Pirouz Adamiat (Persian: پیروز آدمیت; born 19 June 1949) is an Iranian fencer. He competed in the individual épée event at the 1972 Summer Olympics.
