= Lo Moon Tong =

Hong Kong fencer

Personal information
- Born: 12 March 1964 (age 62)

Sport
- Sport: Fencing
Medal record
Men's foil
Representing Hong Kong
Asian Games
| Bronze medal – third place | 1990 Beijing | Team |

Ringo Lo Moon Tong (Chinese: 盧滿堂; Jyutping: lou4 mun5 tong4, born 12 March 1964) is a Hong Kong fencer. He competed in the individual foil event at the 1992 Summer Olympics. He also participated at the 1990 Asian Games and won a bronze medal in team foil event.
