= Ahmad Akbari =

Iranian fencer (1947–2022)

Ahmad Akbari Javid
Personal information
- Born: 10 February 1947
- Died: 17 October 2022 (aged 75)

Sport
- Sport: Fencing
Medal record
Men's fencing
Representing Iran
Asian Games
| Gold medal – first place | 1974 Tehran | Team sabre |
| Bronze medal – third place | 1974 Tehran | Team foil |

Ahmad Akbari Javid (Persian: احمد اکبری جاوید; 10 February 1947 – 17 October 2022) was an Iranian fencer. He competed in the individual and team foil and team sabre events at the 1976 Summer Olympics.

Akbari died on 17 October 2022, at the age of 75.
