= Hideaki Kamei =

Japanese fencer (born 1949)

Personal information
- Nationality: Japanese
- Born: 12 July 1949 (age 76) Japan
- Height: 5.5 ft (1.66 m)
- Weight: 119 lb (54 kg)

Sport
- Country: Japan
- Sport: Fencing

Achievements and titles
- Olympic finals: 1976 Summer Olympics

Hideaki Kamei (亀井 秀明, Kamei Hideaki; born 12 July 1949) is a Japanese fencer. He competed in the team foil event at the 1976 Summer Olympics.
