= Chang Mi-kyung =

South Korean fencer (born 1971)

Personal information
- Born: 7 July 1971 (age 54)

Sport
- Sport: Fencing

- Chang Mi-kyung
- Hangul: 장미경
- RR: Jang Migyeong
- MR: Chang Migyŏng

Chang Mi-kyung (Korean: 장미경; born 7 July 1971) is a South Korean fencer. She competed in the women's team foil event at the 1992 Summer Olympics.
