= Xiao Aihua =

Chinese fencer (born 1971)

Personal information
- Born: 16 March 1971 (age 55) Jiangsu, China

Sport
- Sport: Fencing
Medal record
Representing China
World Championships
Bronze medal – third place	1990 Lyon	Team foil
Bronze medal – third place	1999 Seoul	Team foil
Asian Games
Gold medal – first place	1990 Beijing	Team foil
Gold medal – first place	1994 Hiroshima	Individual foil
Gold medal – first place	1994 Hiroshima	Team foil
Gold medal – first place	1998 Bangkok	Individual foil
Silver medal – second place	1990 Beijing	Individual foil
Silver medal – second place	1998 Bangkok	Team foil
Summer Universiade
Silver medal – second place	1991 Sheffield	Individual foil
Silver medal – second place	1991 Sheffield	Team foil
Bronze medal – third place	1989 Duisburg	Team foil
Bronze medal – third place	1995 Fukuoka	Team foil
Bronze medal – third place	1997 Catania	Individual foil
Bronze medal – third place	1999 Palma de Mallorca	Individual foil

Xiao Aihua (born 16 March 1971) is a Chinese fencer. She competed in the women's foil events at the 1988, 1992, 1996 and 2000 Summer Olympics.
