= Hiroki Ichigatani =

Japanese fencer (born 1969)

Personal information
- Born: 6 May 1969 (age 57) Kagoshima, Japan

Sport
- Sport: Fencing

Hiroki Ichigatani (市ヶ谷 廣輝, Ichigatani Hiroki; born 6 May 1969) is a Japanese fencer. He competed in the individual foil event at the 1992 and 1996 Summer Olympics.
