= Toshiaki Araki =

Japanese fencer (born 1942)

Personal information
- Born: 31 May 1942 (age 84) Utashinai, Hokkaido, Japan

Sport
- Sport: Fencing

Toshiaki Araki (荒木 敏明, Araki Toshiaki; born 31 May 1942) is a Japanese fencer. He competed in the individual and team épée events at the 1964 Summer Olympics.
