= Tang Kwong Hau =

Hong Kong fencer

Personal information
- Born: 9 September 1969 (age 56)

Sport
- Sport: Fencing

Tang Kwong Hau (Chinese: 鄧廣豪; Jyutping: dang^{6} gwong^{2} hou^{4}; born 9 September 1969) is a Hong Kong fencer. He competed in the individual foil event at the 1992 Summer Olympics.
