= Yang Dal-sik =

South Korean fencer

Personal information
- Born: 19 October 1963 (age 62)

Sport
- Sport: Fencing

Yang Dal-sik (born 19 October 1963) is a South Korean fencer. He competed in the team épée event at the 1988 Summer Olympics.
