= Lee Ho-sung (fencer) =

South Korean fencer (born 1968)

Personal information
- Born: 8 March 1968 (age 58)

Sport
- Sport: Fencing

- Lee Ho-sung
- Hangul: 이호성
- RR: I Hoseong
- MR: I Hosŏng

Lee Ho-sung (born 8 March 1968) is a South Korean fencer. He competed in the team foil events at the 1992 Summer Olympics.
