= Yoshihide Nagano =

Japanese fencer

Personal information
- Born: 3 June 1969 (age 56); Ibaraki, Japan

Sport
- Sport: Fencing

Yoshihide Nagano (永野 義秀, Nagano Yoshihide; born 3 June 1969) is a Japanese fencer. He competed in the individual foil event at the 1992 Summer Olympics.
