= Lee Young-rok =

South Korean fencer

Personal information
- Born: 9 January 1965 (age 61)

Sport
- Sport: Fencing

- Lee Young-rok
- Hangul: 이영록
- RR: I Yeongrok
- MR: I Yŏngnok

Lee Young-rok (born 9 January 1965) is a South Korean fencer. He competed in the team foil event at the 1988 Summer Olympics.
