= Ning Xiankui =

Chinese fencer

Personal information
- Born: 19 May 1967 (age 59)

Sport
- Sport: Fencing

Ning Xiankui (Chinese: 寧 憲奎; born 19 May 1967) is a Chinese fencer. He competed in the team sabre event at the 1992 Summer Olympics.
