= Masaya Fukuda =

Japanese fencer (born 1946)

Personal information
- Born: 5 October 1946 (age 79) Hyōgo Prefecture, Japan

Sport
- Sport: Fencing

Masaya Fukuda (福田 正哉, Fukuda Masaya; born 5 October 1946) is a Japanese fencer. He competed in the team foil events at the 1968 and 1972 Summer Olympics.
