= Mahvash Shafaei =

Iranian fencer

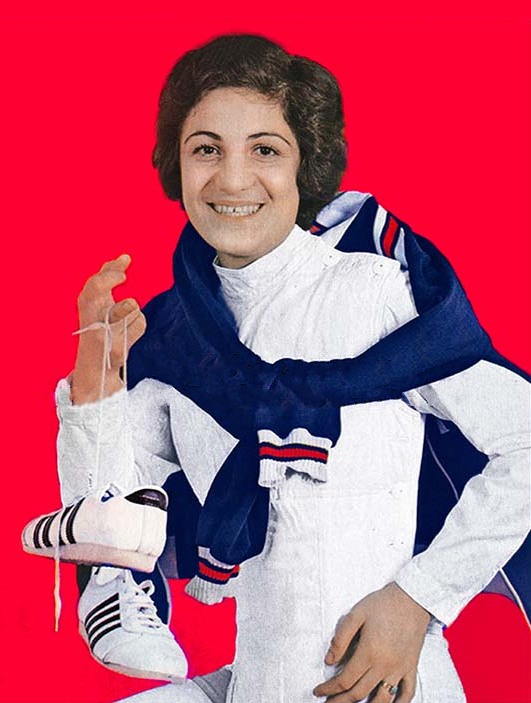
- Shafaei in 1974

Personal information
- Born: 15 May 1956 (age 70) Tehran, Iran
- Height: 160 cm (5 ft 3 in)
- Weight: 54 kg (119 lb)

Sport
- Sport: Fencing
- Event: Foil
- Coached by: Manouchehr Shafaei
Medal record
Representing Iran
Asian Games
Gold medal – first place	1974 Tehran	Team foil
Silver medal – second place	1974 Tehran	Individual foil
Asian Fencing Championships
Gold medal – first place	1973 Tehran	Individual foil

Mahvash Shafaei (Persian: مهوش شفائی; born 15 May 1956) is a retired Iranian foil fencer. In 1973 she became the first Iranian woman to win a gold medal at the Asian Fencing Championships. Next year she won two medals at the 1974 Asian Games. She placed 45th and 9th in the individual and team events at the 1976 Summer Olympics, respectively.

Shafaei was born in a fencing family. Her elder brother Manouchehr competed internationally and coached Mahvash.

== See also ==
- List of Asian Games medalists in fencing
