= Cho Hee-jae =

South Korean fencer

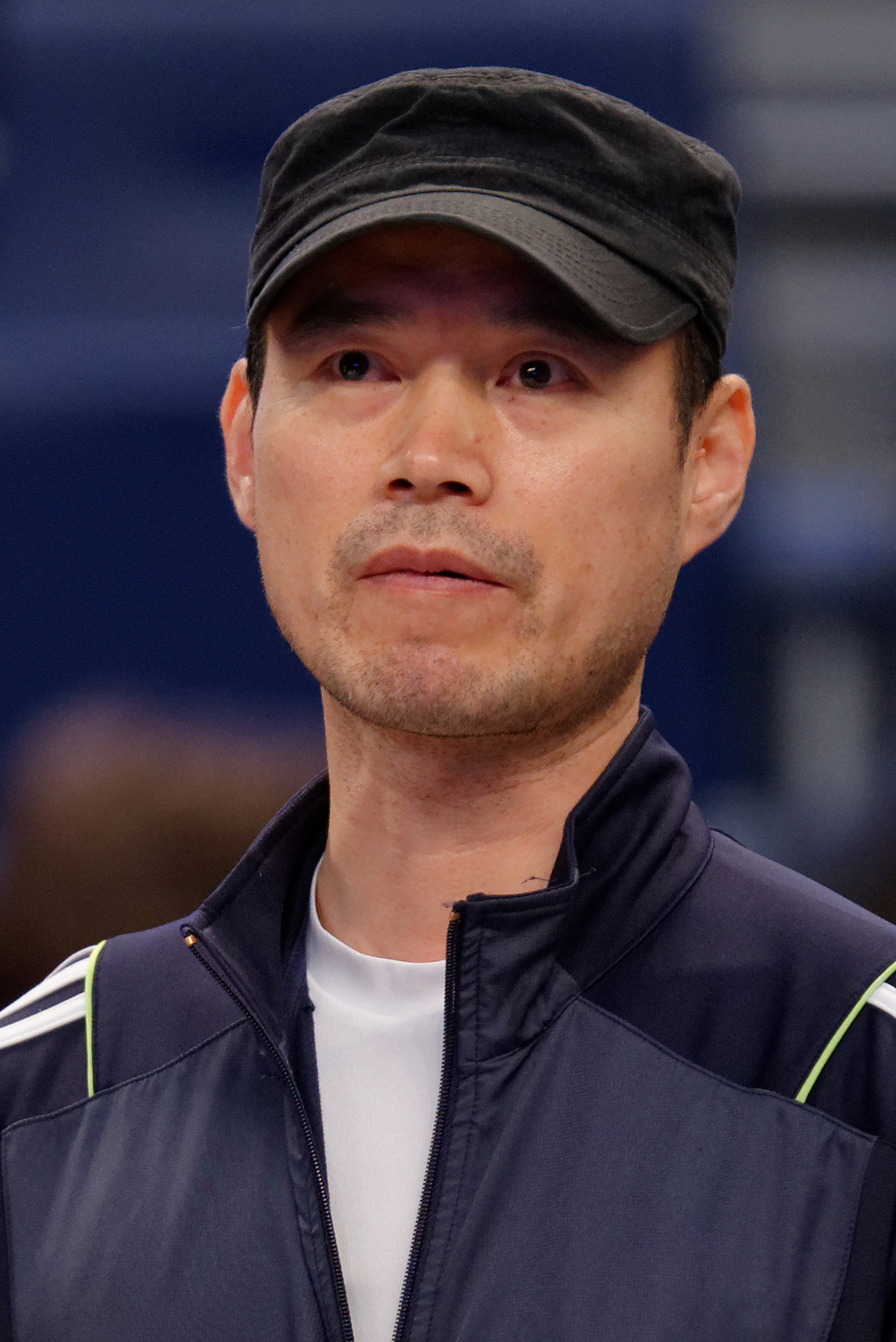
- Jo at the 2014 Trophée Monal

Personal information
- Born: 22 October 1965 (age 60)

Fencing career
- Sport: Fencing
- Country: South Korea
- Weapon: épée

- Cho Hee-jae
- Hangul: 조희제
- Hanja: 趙熙濟
- RR: Jo Huije
- MR: Cho Hŭije

Cho Hee-jae (born 22 October 1965) is a South Korean fencer. He competed in the team épée event at the 1988 Summer Olympics. He now coaches the Korea men's épée team.
