= Tak Jung-im =

South Korean fencer

Personal information
- Born: 4 March 1967 (age 59)

Korean name
- Hangul: 탁정임
- Hanja: 卓貞任
- RR: Tak Jeongim
- MR: T'ak Chŏngim

Sport
- Sport: Fencing

Tak Jung-im (born 4 March 1967) is a South Korean fencer.

== Career ==
Tak competed in the women's individual and team foil events at the 1988 Summer Olympics. She went on to win a gold medal in the individual foil event at the 1990 Asian Games.

== Personal life ==
Tak grew up in Busan, where she took up fencing as a first-year student at Namdo Girls' Middle School (南都여중). She continued in the sport after she went on to Yeongdo Girls' High School (영도여고), and was chosen for the South Korean national team in her second year of high school. Soon after the 1990 Asian Games, she retired from sport and married fellow fencer Hong Yeong-Seung, one of several marriages between fencing team members around that time.
