= Jiang Yefei =

Chinese fencer (born 1967)

Personal information
- Born: 22 February 1967 (age 59)

Sport
- Sport: Fencing

Jiang Yefei (Chinese: 蔣 葉菲; born 22 February 1967) is a Chinese fencer. He competed in the team sabre event at the 1992 Summer Olympics.
