= Miwako Shimada =

Japanese fencer (born 1972)

Personal information
- Born: 4 October 1972 (age 53) Wakayama, Wakayama, Japan

Sport
- Sport: Fencing

Miwako Shimada (嶋田 美和子, Shimada Miwako; born 4 October 1972) is a Japanese fencer. She competed in the women's individual foil event at the 2000 Summer Olympics.
