= Kim Bong-man =

South Korean fencer

Personal information
- Born: 7 April 1963 (age 63)

Sport
- Sport: Fencing

Korean name
- Hangul: 김봉만
- Hanja: 金奉萬
- RR: Gim Bongman
- MR: Kim Pongman

Kim Bong-man (born 7 April 1963) is a South Korean fencer. He competed in the team épée event at the 1984 Summer Olympics.
