= Ko Nak-choon =

South Korean fencer

Personal information
- Nationality: South Korean
- Born: 10 April 1963 (age 63)

Sport
- Sport: Fencing

Korean name
- Hangul: 고낙춘
- Hanja: 高樂春
- RR: Go Nakchun
- MR: Ko Nakch'un

Ko Nak-choon (Korean: 고낙춘; born 10 April 1963) is a South Korean fencer. He competed in the individual and team foil events at the 1988 Summer Olympics.
