= You Sang-joo =

South Korean fencer

Personal information
- Born: 11 December 1968 (age 57)

Sport
- Sport: Fencing
- Retired: Yes
- Now coaching: Yes

- You Sang-joo
- Hangul: 유상주
- RR: Yu Sangju
- MR: Yu Sangju

You Sang-joo (born 11 December 1968) is a retired South Korean fencer. He competed in the individual and team sabre events at the 1996 Summer Olympics.
