= Silvia Koeswandi =

Indonesian fencer

Personal information
- Born: 25 August 1959 (age 66) Makassar, South Sulawesi, Indonesia

Sport
- Sport: Fencing

Silvia Koeswandi (born 25 August 1959) is an Indonesian fencer. She competed in the women's individual foil event at the 1988 Summer Olympics, losing all four of her bouts.

Koeswandi was born in Makassar in 1959. A foil and epee fencer, she competed at the 1978 Asian Games and won a bronze medal in the team foil event. In 1988, she was selected for the Summer Olympics and finished 43rd in the individual foil event, losing each of her four bouts. In 1990, she returned to the Asian Games, winning a silver medal in the individual epee event and a bronze in the team event. As of 2018, she remained the most decorated female Indonesian fencer at the Asian Games, with a total of three medals.
