= Seo Sung-jun =

South Korean fencer

Personal information
- Born: 25 January 1971 (age 55)

Sport
- Sport: Fencing
- College team: Korea National Sport University
- Team: Seoul Metro

Achievements and titles

Korean name
- Hangul: 서성준
- Hanja: 徐聖俊
- RR: Seo Seongjun
- MR: Sŏ Sŏngjun

Seo Sung-jun (born 25 January 1971) is a South Korean fencer. He competed in the individual and team sabre events at the 1996 Summer Olympics.
