= Zhu Qingyuan =

Chinese fencer (born 1957)

Personal information
- Born: 17 May 1957 (age 69)

Sport
- Sport: Fencing

Zhu Qingyuan (born 17 May 1957) is a Chinese fencer. She competed in the women's individual and team foil events at the 1984 and 1988 Summer Olympics.
