= Wang Lihong (fencer) =

Chinese fencer

Personal information
- Born: 3 February 1968 (age 58)

Sport
- Sport: Fencing

Wang Lihong (Chinese: 王 利宏; born 3 February 1968) is a Chinese fencer. He competed in the individual and team foil events at the 1992 Summer Olympics.
