= Manouchehr Shafaei =

Manoochehr Shafaei
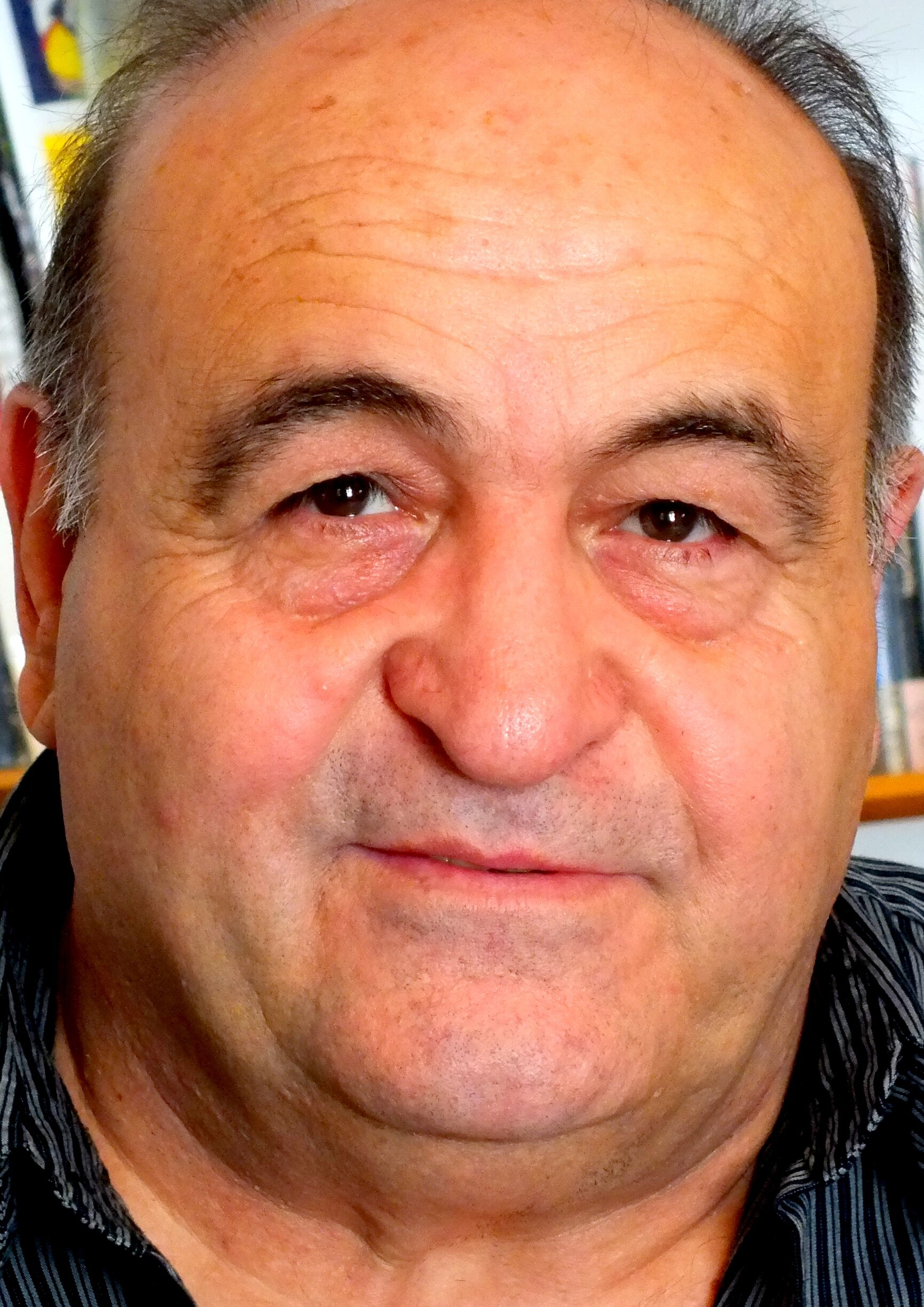
- Manouchehr Shafaei, 2012.

Personal information
- Nationality: Iranian and Germans
- Born: 23 September 1949 (age 76) Tehran, Iran
- Education: University of Tehran
- Occupations: Human rights activists; inventor

Sport
- Sport: Fencing
- Event: sabre
Medal record
Representing Iran
Asian Games
Gold medal – first place	1974 Tehran	Team sabre
Silver medal – second place	1974 Tehran	Individual sabre

Manoochehr Shafaei (Persian: منوچهر شفایی; born 23 September 1949) is an Iranian human rights activist, journalist, founder and owner of the Azadegy magazine, founder and chairman of the board of Human Rights Defending Association for Iran, inventor and retired sabre fencer. As a fencer he won a gold and a bronze medal at the 1974 Asian Games. He also coached his younger sister Mahvash.
