= Chun Mi-kyung =

South Korean fencer (born 1973)

Personal information
- Born: 17 February 1973 (age 53)

Sport
- Sport: Fencing

Korean name
- Hangul: 전미경
- Hanja: 全美儆
- RR: Jeon Migyeong
- MR: Chŏn Migyŏng

Chun Mi-kyung (born 17 February 1973) is a South Korean fencer. She competed in the women's foil events at the 1992 and 1996 Summer Olympics.
