= Hong Young-seung =

South Korean fencer

Personal information
- Born: 9 December 1962 (age 63)

Korean name
- Hangul: 홍영승
- Hanja: 洪永勝
- RR: Hong Yeongseung
- MR: Hong Yŏngsŭng

Sport
- Sport: Fencing

Hong Young-seung (born 9 December 1962) is a South Korean fencer. He competed in the team foil event at the 1988 Summer Olympics. He married fellow fencer Tak Jeong-Im in 1991, in one of several marriages between South Korean national fencing team members around that time.
