= Kim Yong-kook =

South Korean fencer

Personal information
- Born: 14 December 1966 (age 59)

Sport
- Sport: Fencing

Korean name
- Hangul: 김용국
- Hanja: 金容國
- RR: Gim Yongguk
- MR: Kim Yongguk

Kim Yong-kook (Korean: 김용국; also transliterated Kim Yong-guk; born 14 December 1966) is a South Korean fencer. He competed in the individual and team foil events at the 1988 and 1996 Summer Olympics.
