= Ko Young-tae =

South Korean businessman and fencer

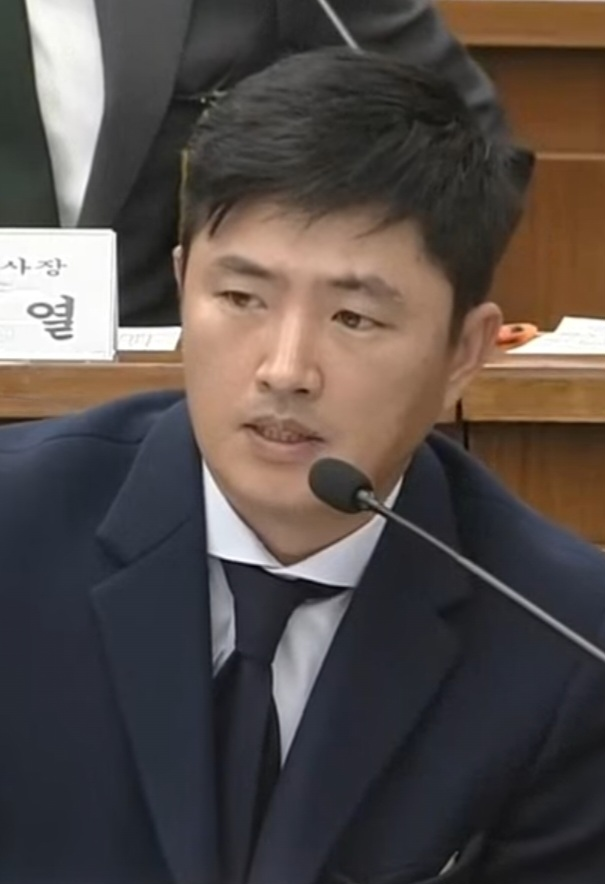

Personal information
- Born: 1976 (age 49–50) Gwangju

Sport
- Sport: Fencing
- College team: Korea National Sport University, Jeonnam Technical High School

Korean name
- Hangul: 고영태
- RR: Go Yeongtae
- MR: Ko Yŏngt'ae

Stage name
- Hangul: 고민우
- RR: Go Minu
- MR: Ko Minu

Ko Young-tae (Korean: 고영태; born 1976) is a South Korean businessman and fencer. He competed in the individual and team sabre events at the 1998 Asian Games.

Ko was a close friend of Choi Soon-sil. Ko is suspected of being involved in the management of The Blue K, Widec Sports, and paper companies. Choi set up these companies in Korea and Germany allegedly to funnel money from the foundations.

He became one of the figures in the 2016 South Korean political scandal involving former President Park Gyun-Hae, and has been described as a whistleblower. He disclosed a documentary showing that his neighbors tried to steal the money from the Mir and the Blue K Foundation by using Choi Soon Shin.

== See also ==
- Host club
