= Lee Wook-jae =

South Korean fencer

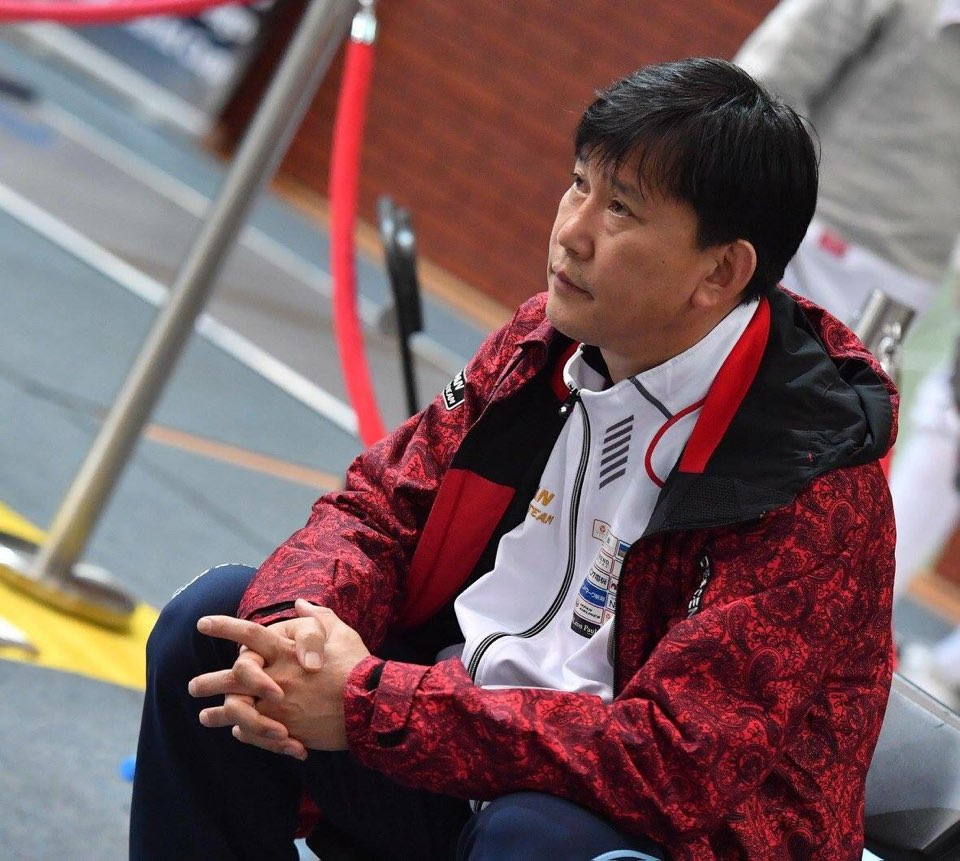

Personal information
- Nationality: Republic of Korea
- Born: 20 February 1965 (age 61)

Sport
- Sport: Fencing
- College team: Korea National Sports University
- Now coaching: Hong Kong Sabre Team

Lee Wook-jae (Korean: 이욱재; Hanja: 李旭宰; born 20 February 1965) was a South Korean fencer. He competed in the individual and team sabre events at the 1988 Summer Olympics. He worked for South Korean men's sabre national team, which took gold medal for team sabre event in 2012 Summer Olympics, and Japanese sabre national team as a head coach. As of May 2013, after the end of Korfanty Cup in Chicago, South Korea's men's sabre team is ranked #1 in FIE ranking system. In 2023, he became a coach of Hong Kong sabre team and LOW Ho Tin won a bronze medal at the Asian Championships after 9 years.
