= Lao Shaopei =

Chinese fencer (born 1962)

Personal information
- Born: 19 April 1962 (age 64)

Sport
- Sport: Fencing

Lao Shaopei (born 19 April 1962) is a Chinese fencer. He competed in the foil events at the 1988 and 1992 Summer Olympics.
