= Lee Sang-ki (fencer) =

South Korean fencer

Personal information
- Nationality: South Korea
- Born: 5 June 1966 (age 60)

Sport
- Sport: Fencing
- Now coaching: Jung Jin-sun
Medal record
Olympic Games
Bronze medal – third place	2000 Sydney	Épée
World Championships
Bronze medal – third place	1994 Athens	Épée
Asian Games
Silver medal – second place	1998 Bangkok	Épée
Bronze medal – third place	1990 Beijing	Épée

Korean name
- Hangul: 이상기
- Hanja: 李相箕
- RR: I Sanggi
- MR: I Sanggi

Lee Sang-ki (Korean: 이상기; born 5 June 1966) is a South Korean retired male épée fencer.

Lee is a four-time Olympian (1988, 1992, 1996, 2000) and bronze medalist at the 1994 World Fencing Championships in Athens, Greece. At the 2000 Olympics in Sydney, he won the bronze medal in the individual épée, defeating 2004 Olympic champion Marcel Fischer of Switzerland in the bronze medal match.
