= Hiroshi Hashimoto (fencer) =

Japanese fencer (born 1964)

Personal information
- Born: 30 October 1964 (age 61) Saitama, Japan

Sport
- Sport: Fencing

Hiroshi Hashimoto (橋本 寛, Hashimoto Hiroshi; born 30 October 1964) is a Japanese fencer. He competed in the individual sabre event at the 1992 Summer Olympics, and lost all six of his bouts.
