= Ma Zhi (fencer) =

Chinese fencer

Personal information
- Born: 10 May 1965 (age 61)

Sport
- Sport: Fencing

Ma Zhi (born 10 May 1965) is a Chinese fencer. He competed in the individual épée event at the 1988 Summer Olympics.
