= Kim Sang-wook (fencer) =

South Korean fencer (born 1964)

Personal information
- Born: 13 June 1964 (age 62)

Sport
- Sport: Fencing

Korean name
- Hangul: 김상욱
- Hanja: 金尙煜
- RR: Gim Sanguk
- MR: Kim Sanguk

Kim Sang-wook (born 13 June 1964) is a South Korean fencer. He competed in the individual and team sabre events at the 1988 Summer Olympics.
