= Koji Emura =

Japanese fencer (born 1961)

Personal information
- Born: 22 February 1961 (age 65)

Sport
- Sport: Fencing

Koji Emura (江村 宏二, Emura Kōji) (born 22 February 1961) is a Japanese fencer. He competed in the individual and team foil events at the 1988 Summer Olympics.
