= Yuko Takayanagi =

Japanese fencer

Personal information
- Born: 11 September 1965 (age 60) Tokyo, Japan

Sport
- Sport: Fencing

Yuko Takayanagi (高柳 裕子, Takayanagi Yuko; born 11 September 1965) is a Japanese fencer. She competed in the women's individual foil event at the 1992 Summer Olympics.
