= Kim Seung-pyo =

South Korean fencer (born 1965)

Personal information
- Born: 1 October 1965 (age 60)

Sport
- Sport: Fencing

Korean name
- Hangul: 김승표
- Hanja: 金承杓
- RR: Gim Seungpyo
- MR: Kim Sŭngp'yo

Kim Seung-pyo (born 1 October 1965) is a South Korean fencer. He competed in the individual and team foil events at the 1988 and 1992 Summer Olympics. He married fellow fencer Shin Seong-ja in 1993.
