= Wang Zhiming (fencer) =

Chinese fencer

Personal information
- Born: 15 September 1964 (age 61)

Sport
- Sport: Fencing

Wang Zhiming (Chinese: 汪志明; pinyin: Wāng Zhìmíng; born 15 September 1964) is a Chinese fencer. He competed in the individual and team sabre events at the 1988 Summer Olympics.
