= Nona Kiritani =

Japanese fencer (born 1967)

Personal information
- Born: 22 August 1967 (age 58)

Sport
- Sport: Fencing

Nona Kiritani (桐谷 乃宇奈, Kiritani Nouna) (born 22 August 1967) is a Japanese fencer. She competed in the women's team foil event at the 1988 Summer Olympics.
