= Lee Hyun-soo =

South Korean fencer

Personal information
- Born: 24 January 1968 (age 58)

Sport
- Sport: Fencing

- Lee Hyun-soo
- Hangul: 이현수
- Hanja: 李賢洙
- RR: I Hyeonsu
- MR: I Hyŏnsu

Lee Hyun-soo (born 24 January 1968) is a South Korean fencer. He competed in the team sabre event at the 1988 Summer Olympics.
