= Fencing at the 2008 Summer Olympics – Men's épée =

Men's épée at the Games of the XXIX Olympiad
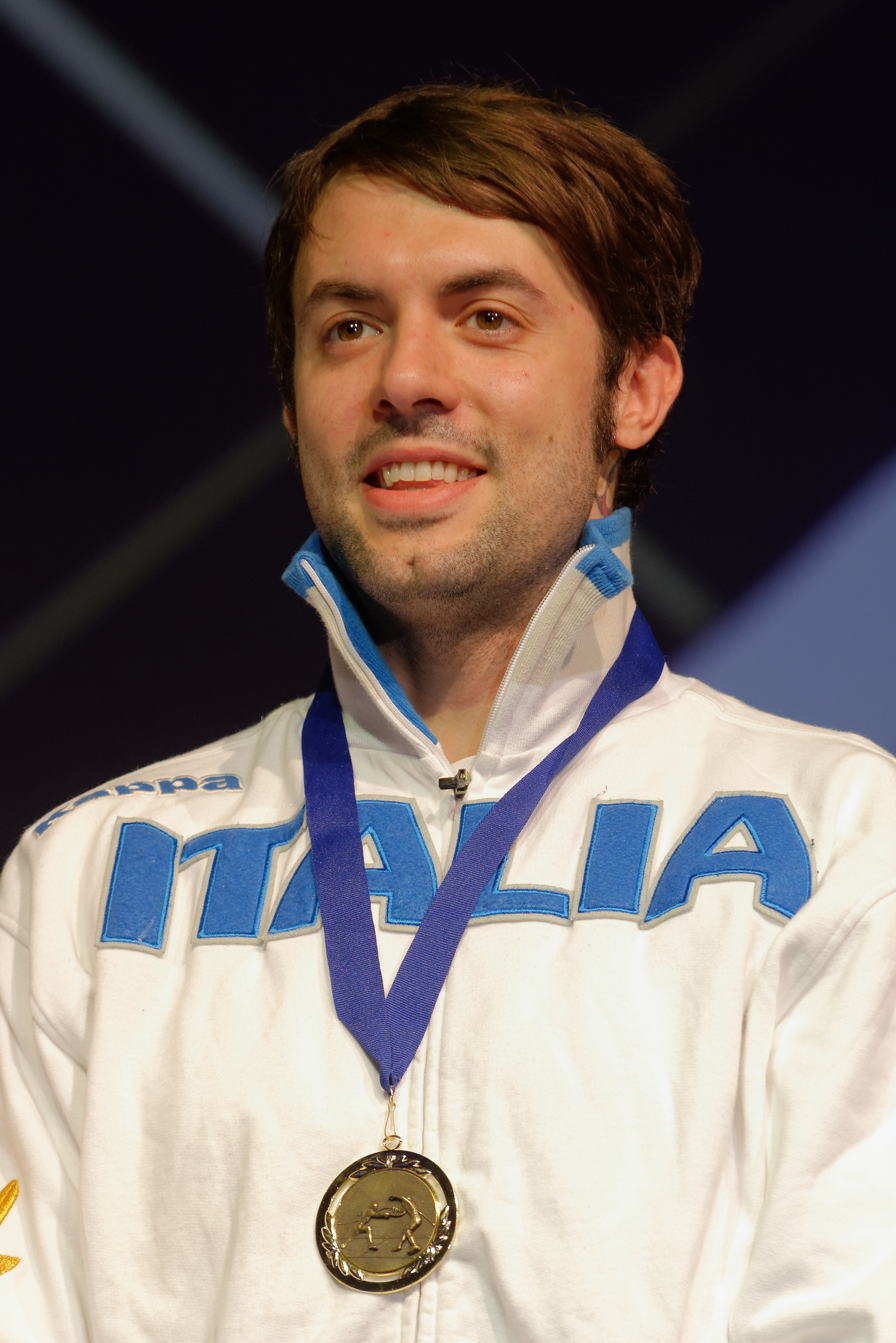
- Matteo Tagliariol (2013)
- Venue: Olympic Green Convention Centre
- Date: 10 August 2008
- Competitors: 41000000 from 23 nations

Medalists
1st place, gold medalist(s)		Matteo Tagliariol	Italy
2nd place, silver medalist(s)		Fabrice Jeannet	France
3rd place, bronze medalist(s)		José Luis Abajo	Spain

The men's épée fencing competition at the 2008 Summer Olympics in Beijing took place on August 10 at the Olympic Green Convention Centre. There were 41 competitors from 23 nations. The event was won by Matteo Tagliariol of Italy, the nation's first victory in the event since 1960 (the last of six consecutive wins) and first medal of any color since 1968. It was Italy's seventh overall victory, most among nations. The silver medal went to Fabrice Jeannet of France. José Luis Abajo earned Spain's first men's individual épée medal with his bronze. The Russian fencers' streak of five Games on the podium (including Russian fencers for the Soviet Union in 1988 and Unified Team in 1992) ended.

== Background ==
This was the 25th appearance of the event, which was not held at the first Games in 1896 (with only foil and sabre events held) but has been held at every Summer Olympics since 1900.

Three of the eight quarterfinalists from 2004 returned: silver medalist Wang Lei of China, fifth-place finisher Fabrice Jeannet of France, and sixth-place finisher Silvio Fernández of Venezuela. The reigning (2007) World Champion was Krisztián Kulcsár of Hungary. Wang had won in 2006.

For only the second time in Olympic history (after 1932), no nations made their debut in the event. France and the United States each appeared for the 23rd time, tied for most among nations.

== Qualification ==
Nations had been limited to three fencers each since 1928. However, the 2008 Games introduced a rotation of men's team fencing events with one weapon left off each Games; the individual event without a corresponding team event had the number of fencers per nation reduced to two. Men's foil was the first event to which this applied to, so the 2008 individual épée competition continued to allow three fencers per nation.

There were 39 dedicated quota spots for men's épée. The 24 fencers from the 8 teams qualified for the team event were all automatically qualified for the individual event. Next, the top 3 men in the FIE Individual Ranking received spots. After that, 7 more men were selected from the ranking based on continents: 2 from Europe, 2 from the Americas, 2 from Asia/Oceania, and 1 from Africa; each nation could only earn one spot from this continental ranking, but it could be added to any spots from the world ranking (up to three total). Finally, five spots were allocated by continental qualifying events: 2 from Europe, 1 from the Americas, 1 from Asia/Oceania, and 1 from Africa. Nations could only earn one spot from these events and only if they had no fencer qualified through rankings.

Additionally, there were 8 host/invitational spots that could be spread throughout the various fencing events. China used only 2 of those places to max out its representation in all events (both in the men's épée, for which only Wang Lei qualified directly), so 6 spots were assigned by Tripartite Commission invitation. None were used in the men's épée, so the total number of competitors was 41: the 39 dedicated places plus 2 host places.

== Competition format ==
The épée competition, following the format introduced in 1996, consisted of a six-round single-elimination bracket with a bronze medal match between the two semifinal losers. Fencing was done to 15 touches or to the completion of three three-minute rounds if neither fencer reached 15 touches by then. At the end of time, the higher-scoring fencer was the winner; a tie resulted in an additional one-minute sudden-death time period. This sudden-death period was further modified by the selection of a draw-winner beforehand; if neither fencer scored a touch during the minute, the predetermined draw-winner won the bout.

== Schedule ==
All times are China Standard Time (UTC+8)

Date	Time	Round
Sunday, 10 August 2008		Round of 32; Round of 16; Quarterfinals; Semifinals; Finals

== Results ==
=== Section 1 ===
Round of 64
33	Nikolai Novosjolov (EST)	15
32	Ahmed Nabil (EGY)	8
41	Aissam Rami (MAR)	11
24	Tomasz Motyka (POL)	15
25	Kim Seung-Gu (KOR)	15
40	Given Maduma (RSA)	12

Round of 32
1	Jérôme Jeannet (FRA)	15
33	Nikolai Novosjolov (EST)	14
17	Kim Won-Jin (KOR)	14
16	José Luis Abajo (ESP)	15
9	Diego Confalonieri (ITA)	15
24	Tomasz Motyka (POL)	10
25	Kim Seung-Gu (KOR)	14
8	Géza Imre (HUN)	15

Round of 16
1	Jérôme Jeannet (FRA)	9
16	José Luis Abajo (ESP)	15
9	Diego Confalonieri (ITA)	15
8	Géza Imre (HUN)	9

Quarterfinals
16	José Luis Abajo (ESP)	14
9	Diego Confalonieri (ITA)	13

=== Section 2 ===
Round of 64
25	Mike Wood (RSA)	7
40	Bohdan Nikishyn (UKR)	15
29	Wolfgang Mejías (VEN)	11
36	Sturla Torkildsen (NOR)	12

Round of 32
5	Michael Kauter (SUI)	15
40	Bohdan Nikishyn (UKR)	12
21	Wang Lei (CHN)	10
12	Bas Verwijlen (NED)	15
13	Ulrich Robeiri (FRA)	15
20	Anton Avdeev (RUS)	11
36	Sturla Torkildsen (NOR)	10
4	Matteo Tagliariol (ITA)	15

Round of 16
5	Michael Kauter (SUI)	13
12	Bas Verwijlen (NED)	15
13	Ulrich Robeiri (FRA)	11
4	Matteo Tagliariol (ITA)	15

Quarterfinals
12	Bas Verwijlen (NED)	11
4	Matteo Tagliariol (ITA)	15

=== Section 3 ===
Round of 64
35	Adam Wiercioch (POL)	11
30	Li Guojie (CHN)	15
27	Fabrice Jeannet (FRA)	15
38	Serguei Katchiourine (KGZ)	14

Round of 32
3	Jung Jin-Sun (KOR)	15
30	Li Guojie (CHN)	6
19	Rubén Limardo (VEN)	13
14	Dmytro Chumak (UKR)	15
11	Maksym Khvorost (UKR)	11
22	Igor Tikhomirov (CAN)	15
27	Fabrice Jeannet (FRA)	15
6	Seth Kelsey (USA)	11

Round of 16
3	Jung Jin-Sun (KOR)	15
14	Dmytro Chumak (UKR)	6
22	Igor Tikhomirov (CAN)	7
27	Fabrice Jeannet (FRA)	15

Quarterfinals
3	Jung Jin-Sun (KOR)	11
27	Fabrice Jeannet (FRA)	15

=== Section 4 ===
Round of 64
39	Dario Torrente (RSA)	10
26	Joaquim Videira (POR)	15
31	Shogo Nishida (JPN)	11
34	Paris Inostroza (CHI)	15

Round of 32
7	Radosław Zawrotniak (POL)	15
26	Joaquim Videira (POR)	9
23	Yin Lianchi (CHN)	15
10	Krisztián Kulcsár (HUN)	9
15	Gábor Boczkó (HUN)	11
18	Alfredo Rota (ITA)	10
34	Paris Inostroza (CHI)	10
2	Silvio Fernández (VEN)	15

Round of 16
7	Radosław Zawrotniak (POL)	15
23	Yin Lianchi (CHN)	13
15	Gábor Boczkó (HUN)	15
2	Silvio Fernández (VEN)	9

Quarterfinals
7	Radosław Zawrotniak (POL)	12
15	Gábor Boczkó (HUN)	15

=== Finals ===
Semifinals
José Luis Abajo (ESP)	12
Matteo Tagliariol (ITA)	15
Fabrice Jeannet (FRA)	15
Gábor Boczkó (HUN)	12

Final
Matteo Tagliariol (ITA)	15
Fabrice Jeannet (FRA)	9
Bronze medal match
José Luis Abajo (ESP)	8
Gábor Boczkó (HUN)	7

== Final classification ==
Rank	Fencer	Nation
1st place, gold medalist(s)	Matteo Tagliariol	Italy
2nd place, silver medalist(s)	Fabrice Jeannet	France
3rd place, bronze medalist(s)	José Luis Abajo	Spain
4	Gábor Boczkó	Hungary
5	Jung Jin-Sun	South Korea
6	Radosław Zawrotniak	Poland
7	Diego Confalonieri	Italy
8	Bas Verwijlen	Netherlands
9	Silvio Fernández	Venezuela
10	Jérôme Jeannet	France
11	Michael Kauter	Switzerland
12	Géza Imre	Hungary
13	Dmytro Chumak	Ukraine
14	Ulrich Robeiri	France
15	Igor Tikhomirov	Canada
16	Lianchi Yin	China
17	Weston Kelsey	United States
18	Krisztián Kulcsár	Hungary
19	Maksym Khvorost	Ukraine
20	Kim Wong-Jin	South Korea
21	Alfredo Rota	Italy
22	Anton Avdeev	Russia
23	Rubén Limardo	Venezuela
24	Lei Wang	China
25	Tomasz Motyka	Poland
26	Joaquim Videira	Portugal
27	Seung-Gu Kim	South Korea
28	Bohdan Nikishyn	Ukraine
29	Guojie Li	China
30	Nikolai Novosjolov	Estonia
31	Paris Inostroza	Chile
32	Sturla Torkildsen	Norway
33	Wolfgang Mejías	Venezuela
34	Ahmed Nabil	Egypt
35	Shogo Nishida	Japan
36	Adam Wiercioch	Poland
37	Serguei Katchiourine	Kyrgyzstan
38	Mike Wood	South Africa
39	Dario Torrente	South Africa
40	Sello Maduma	South Africa
41	Aissam Rami	Morocco
