= 2002–03 Fencing World Cup =

International fencing competition

The 32nd FIE Fencing World Cup began in October 2002 and concluded in October 2003 at the 2003 World Fencing Championships in Havana, Cuba.

== Individual Épée ==
=== Men's épée ===
Color key

- Zone Championships
- Grand Prix
- World Cup
- Satellite

Date	Event	Type	Gold	Silver	Bronze
8 September 2002	Tournoi satellite épée masculine, Aarhus	Satellite	Jonas Nordby (NOR)	Mads Eriksen (DEN)	Gerald Hinz (GER); Sturla Torkildsen (NOR)
13 October 2002	Tournoi satellite épée masculine, Turku	Satellite	Kaido Kaaberma (EST)	Tor Forsse (SWE)	Aivar Liimets (EST); Péter Vánky (SWE)
20 October 2002	Tournoi satellite épée masculine, Oslo	Satellite	Magnus Nerell (SWE)	Claus Mørch (NOR)	Fredrik Nilsson (SWE); Sturla Torkildsen (NOR)
27 October 2002	Tournoi satellite épée masculine, Copenhague	Satellite	András Koroknay-Pál (FIN)	Viktor Zuikov (EST)	Sturla Torkildsen (NOR); Magnus Malmgren (SWE)
26 January 2003	Glaive de Tallinn, Tallinn	World Cup	Basil Hoffmann (SUI)	Jörg Fiedler (GER)	Igor Turchin (RUS); Robert Dingl (SWE)
2 February 2003	Torneio Vitalis Cidade de Lisboa, Lisbon	Grand Prix	Ulrich Robeiri (FRA)	Frédéric Bouliere (FRA)	Christoph Marik (AUT); Francesco Martinelli (ITA)
9 February 2003	Tournoi Ciudad de Barcelona, Barcelona	Grand Prix	Iván Kovács (HUN)	Fabrice Jeannet (FRA)	Géza Imre (HUN); Tomasz Motyka (POL)
23 February 2003	Challenge Tokaj Express, Budapest	World Cup	Christoph Marik (AUT)	Alexander Gorbachuk (RUS)	Attila Fekete (HUN); Igor Turchin (RUS)
2 March 2003	Épée Club Trophy, London	World Cup	Daniel Strigel (GER)	Federico Bollati (ITA)	Péter Vánky (SWE); Jörg Fiedler (GER)
9 March 2003	Grand Prix de Slovaquie, Bratislava	World Cup	Marcel Fischer (SUI)	Vitaly Zakharov (BLR)	Alexandru Nyisztor (ROU); Arwin Kardolus (NED)
16 March 2003	Challenge R. Monal, Paris	World Cup	Ulrich Robeiri (FRA)	Christoph Kneip (GER)	Marcel Fischer (SUI); Frédéric Delpla (FRA)
22 March 2003	Épée Internationale de Montréal, Montreal	Grand Prix	Fabrice Jeannet (FRA)	Kaido Kaaberma (EST)	Ulrich Robeiri (FRA); Jörg Fiedler (GER)
29 March 2003	Coupe du Monde, Bogotá	Grand Prix	Marcus Robatsch (AUT)	Christoph Marik (AUT)	Bas Verwijlen (NED); Marcel Fischer (SUI)
27 April 2003	Coupe du Monde, Tunis	Grand Prix	Christoph Marik (AUT)	Marcel Fischer (SUI)	Diego Confalonieri (ITA); Davide Schaier (ITA)
3 May 2003	Heidenheimer Pokal, Heidenheim	World Cup	Jérôme Jeannet (FRA)	Dmytro Chumak (UKR)	Fabrice Jeannet (FRA); Gauthier Grumier (FRA)
11 May 2003	Trophée Carroccio, Legnano	World Cup	Alfredo Rota (ITA)	Marcel Fischer (SUI)	Alexei Cheremski (ISR); Siebren Tigchelaar (NED)
18 May 2003	Coupe du Monde, Innsbruck	World Cup	Marcel Fischer (SUI)	Jörg Fiedler (GER)	Vitaliy Osharov (UKR); Attila Fekete (HUN)
25 May 2003	Coupe du Monde, Buenos Aires	World Cup	Yoeri Van Laecke (BEL)	Marcel Fischer (SUI)	Eduardo Sepulveda (ESP); Claus Mørch (NOR)
8 June 2003	Challenge Bernadotte, Stockholm	Grand Prix	Érik Boisse (FRA)	Tuo Tong (CHN)	Zhao Gang (CHN); Fabrice Jeannet (FRA)
15 June 2003	Grand Prix de Berne, Bern	World Cup	Péter Vánky (SWE)	Marcel Fischer (SUI)	Arwin Kardolus (NED); Alfredo Rota (ITA)
24 June 2003	Tournoi Ramon Fonst, Havana	World Cup	Christoph Marik (AUT)	Andrés Carillo (CUB)	Wolfgang Reich (GER); Weston Kelsey (USA)
28 June 2003	Coupe du Monde Gigante, Carolina, Puerto Rico	World Cup	José Luis Abajo (ESP)	Christoph Marik (AUT)	Alfredo Rota (ITA); Claus Mørch (NOR)
5 July 2003	Coupe du Monde, Teheran	World Cup	Yoeri Van Laecke (BEL)	Ralf Bißdorf (GER)	José Luis Abajo (ESP); Arwin Kardolus (NED)
19 July 2003	Challenge Australia, Sydney	World Cup	Zhao Gang (CHN)	Dmytro Karyuchenko (UKR)	Jérôme Jeannet (FRA); Érik Boisse (FRA)

=== Women's épée ===
Color key

- Zone Championships
- Grand Prix
- World Cup
- Satellite

Date	Event	Type	Gold	Silver	Bronze
8 September 2002	Tournoi satellite épée masculine, Aarhus	Satellite	Carin Cederquist (DEN)	Jette Aagaard Rosenkvist (DEN)	Tine Høj Andersen (DEN); Wendy Kuiper (NED)
13 October 2002	Tournoi satellite épée masculine, Turku	Satellite	Irina Embrich (EST)	Olga Aleksejeva (EST)	Borbála Fábián (HUN); Valentina Zaitseva (EST)
20 October 2002	Tournoi satellite épée masculine, Oslo	Satellite	Maria Isaksson (SWE)	Hilla Hämäläinen (FIN)	Vera Heppt (NOR); Margrethe Mørch (NOR)
27 October 2002	Tournoi satellite épée masculine, Copenhague	Satellite	Anastassia Jelinevits (EST)	Sofie Larsson (SWE)	Olga Volovik (EST); Nina Björkman (FIN)
25 January 2003	Coupe Martini, Budapest	Grand Prix	Imke Duplitzer (GER)	Sherraine MacKay (CAN)	Iuliana Măceșeanu (ROU); Sonja Tol (NED)
2 February 2003	Prague d’Or, Prague	World Cup	Anna Sivkova (RUS)	Sonja Tol (NED)	Evelyn Halls (AUS); Lyubov Shutova (RUS)
16 February 2003	Ipswich Cup, Ipswich	World Cup	Claudia Bokel (GER)	Britta Heidemann (GER)	Imke Duplitzer (GER); Jessica Beer (NZL)
23 February 2003	Würth Cup, Tauberbischofsheim	World Cup	Adrienn Hormay (HUN)	Ildikó Mincza (HUN)	Anna Sivkova (RUS); Laura Flessel-Colovic (FRA)
2 March 2003	Coupe J.M. Rektor, Katowice	World Cup	Sonja Tol (NED)	Eva Vybornova (UKR)	Yana Shemyakina (UKR); Tatiana Misevich (UKR)
16 March 2003	Challenge J. Nowara, Luxembourg	World Cup	Sara Cristina Cometti (ITA)	Elisa Uga (ITA)	Marijana Marković (GER); Patricia Osyczka (GER)
22 March 2003	Tournoi de Saint Maur, Saint-Maur-des-Fossés	World Cup	Adrienn Hormay (HUN)	Laura Flessel-Colovic (FRA)	Hajnalka Tóth (HUN); Hajnalka Király-Picot (FRA)
30 March 2003	Coupe de Göteborg, Gothenburg	World Cup	Sonja Tol (NED)	Britta Heidemann (GER)	Marijana Marković (GER); Gianna Hablützel-Bürki (SUI)
26 April 2003	Coupe du Monde, Tunis	Grand Prix	Laura Flessel-Colovic (FRA)	Claudia Bokel (GER)	Hajnalka Király-Picot (FRA); Sophie Lamon (SUI)
4 May 2003	Coupe du Monde, Mödling	World Cup	Sherraine MacKay (CAN)	Sonja Tol (NED)	Tatiana Logunova (RUS); Claudia Bokel (GER)
10 May 2003	Challenge Zürich, Zurich	World Cup	Lee Keum-nam (KOR)	Katja Nass (GER)	Sophie Lamon (SUI); Karina Aznavourian (RUS)
17 May 2003	Trophée Citta di Legnano, Legnano	World Cup	Zhang Li (CHN)	Shen Weiwei (CHN)	Lee Keum-nam (KOR); Tímea Nagy (HUN)
24 May 2003	Tournoi international de Málaga, Málaga	Grand Prix	Nadiya Kazimirchuk (UKR)	Tatiana Logunova (RUS)	Anna Sivkova (RUS); Ildikó Mincza (HUN)
1 June 2003	Challenge Jean Coibion, Welkenraedt	World Cup	Kim Hee-jeong (KOR)	Britta Heidemann (GER)	Nadiya Kazimirchuk (UKR); Gianna Hablützel-Bürki (SUI)
21 June 2003	Coupe du Monde, Havana	Grand Prix	Hajnalka Király-Picot (FRA)	Sophie Lamon (SUI)	Hajnalka Tóth (HUN); Eva Vybornova (UKR)
29 June 2003	Coupe du Monde Gigante, Carolina	World Cup	Laura Flessel-Colovic (FRA)	Maria Isaksson (SWE)	Cristiana Cascioli (ITA); Tímea Nagy (HUN)
19 July 2003	Challenge Australia, Sydney	Grand Prix	Sherraine MacKay (CAN)	Imke Duplitzer (GER)	Magdalena Grabowska (POL); Tatiana Logunova (RUS)

Men
1	Christoph Marik (AUT)
2	Fabrice Jeannet (FRA)
3	Marcel Fischer (SUI)
4	Ulrich Robeiri (FRA)
5	Jörg Fiedler (GER)
6	Yoeri Van Laecke (BEL)
7	Alfredo Rota (ITA)
8	Érik Boisse (FRA)

Women
1	Laura Flessel-Colovic (FRA)
2	Sherraine McKay (CAN)
3	Hajnalka Kiraly-Picot (FRA)
4	Imke Duplitzer (GER)
5	Britta Heidemann (GER)
6	Sonja Tol (NED)
7	Adrienn Hormay (HUN)
8	Sophie Lamon (SUI)

== Individual Foil ==
Men
1	André Weßels (GER)
2	Andrea Cassarà (ITA)
3	Peter Joppich (GER)
4	Salvatore Sanzo (ITA)
5	João Gomes (POR)
6	Simone Vanni (ITA)
7	Cédric Gohy (BEL)
8	Richard Breutner (GER)

Women
1	Valentina Vezzali (ITA)
2	Giovanna Trillini (ITA)
3	Sylwia Gruchała (POL)
4	Yekaterina Yusheva (RUS)
5	Aida Mohamed (HUN)
6	Adeline Wuillème (FRA)
7	Rita König-Römer (GER)
8	Svetlana Boyko (RUS)

== Individual Sabre ==
Men
1	Domonkos Ferjancsik (HUN)
2	Aldo Montano (ITA)
3	Keeth Smart (USA)
4	Nicolas Limbach (GER)
5	Zsolt Nemcsik (HUN)
6	Mihai Covaliu (ROU)
7	Fernando Medina (ESP)
8	Julien Pillet (FRA)

Women
1	Sada Jacobson (USA)
2	Cécile Argiolas (FRA)
3	Yelena Jemayeva (AZE)
4	Yelena Nechayeva (RUS)
5	Aleksandra Socha (POL)
6	Gioia Marzocca (ITA)
7	Léonore Perrus (FRA)
8	Susanne König (GER)

== Team Épée ==
Men
1	France
2	Ukraine
3	Germany
4	Russia
5	Estonia
6	Hungary
7	Russia
8	Switzerland

Women
1	France
2	Hungary
3	Germany
4	Russia
5	Italy
6	Estonia
7	Ukraine
8	China

== Team Foil ==
Men
1	Italy
2	China
3	France
4	Germany
5	Spain
6	Belgium
7	United States
8	Poland

Women
1	Italy
2	Russia
3	Poland
4	Hungary
5	Romania
6	France
7	United States
8	Japan

== Team Sabre ==
Men
1	Russia
2	Hungary
3	Ukraine
4	Italy
5	Romania
6	France
7	Germany
8	Poland

Women
1	United States
2	France
3	Hungary
4	Russia
5	Azerbaijan
6	Germany
7	Romania
8	Italy
