= Fencing at the 2008 Summer Olympics – Men's team épée =

Men's team épée at the Games of the XXIX Olympiad
- Venue: Olympic Green Convention Centre
- Date: 15 August 2008
- Competitors: 32 from 9 nations

Medalists
1st place, gold medalist(s)		Fabrice Jeannet; Jérôme Jeannet; Ulrich Robeiri	France
2nd place, silver medalist(s)		Robert Andrzejuk; Tomasz Motyka; Adam Wiercioch; Radosław Zawrotniak	Poland
3rd place, bronze medalist(s)		Stefano Carozzo; Diego Confalonieri; Alfredo Rota; Matteo Tagliariol	Italy

The men's team épée fencing competition at the Beijing 2008 Summer Olympics took place on August 15 at the Olympic Green Convention Centre.

The team épée competition consisted of a four-round single-elimination bracket with a bronze medal match between the two semifinal losers and classification semifinals and finals for 5th to 8th places. Teams consist of three members each. Matches consist of nine bouts, with every fencer on one team facing each fencer on the other team. Scoring carried over between bouts with a total of 45 touches being the team goal. Bouts lasted until one team reached the target multiple of 5 touches. For example, if the first bout ended with a score of 5-3, that score would remain into the next bout and the second bout would last until one team reached 10 touches. Bouts also had a maximum time of three minutes each; if the final bout ended before either team reached 45 touches, the team leading at that point won. A tie at that point would result in an additional one-minute sudden-death time period. This sudden-death period was further modified by the selection of a draw-winner beforehand; if neither fencer scored a touch during the minute, the predetermined draw-winner won the bout.

== Draw ==
=== Finals ===
Round of 16
9	South Africa	28
8	China	45

Quarterfinals
1	Hungary	43
8	China	45
5	Ukraine	37
4	Poland	45
3	Italy	45
6	South Korea	37
7	Venezuela	33
2	France	45

Semifinals
8	China	44
4	Poland	45
3	Italy	39
2	France	45

Finals
4	Poland	29
2	France	45
Third place
8	China	35
3	Italy	45

=== Classification 5- 8 ===
Placement 5-8
1	Hungary	41
5	Ukraine	29
6	South Korea	38
7	Venezuela	45

Placement 5-6
1	Hungary	40
7	Venezuela	25
Placement 7-8
5	Ukraine	41
6	South Korea	39

== Final classification ==
Rank	Team	Athlete
1st place, gold medalist(s)	France	Fabrice Jeannet; Jérôme Jeannet; Ulrich Robeiri
2nd place, silver medalist(s)	Poland	Robert Andrzejuk; Tomasz Motyka; Adam Wiercioch; Radosław Zawrotniak
3rd place, bronze medalist(s)	Italy	Stefano Carozzo; Diego Confalonieri; Alfredo Rota; Matteo Tagliariol
4	China	Li Guojie; Wang Lei; Yin Lianchi; Dong Guotao
5	Hungary	Gábor Boczkó; Géza Imre; Krisztián Kulcsár; Iván Kovács
6	Venezuela	Silvio Fernández; Francisco Limardo; Rubén Limardo
7	Ukraine	Maksym Khvorost; Dmytro Chumak; Bogdan Nikishin; Vitalii Medvedev
8	South Korea	Jung Jin-Sun; Kim Won-Jin; Kim Seung-Gu
9	South Africa	Dario Torrente; Sello Maduma; Mike Wood
