= Diego Confalonieri =

Italian fencer (born 1979)

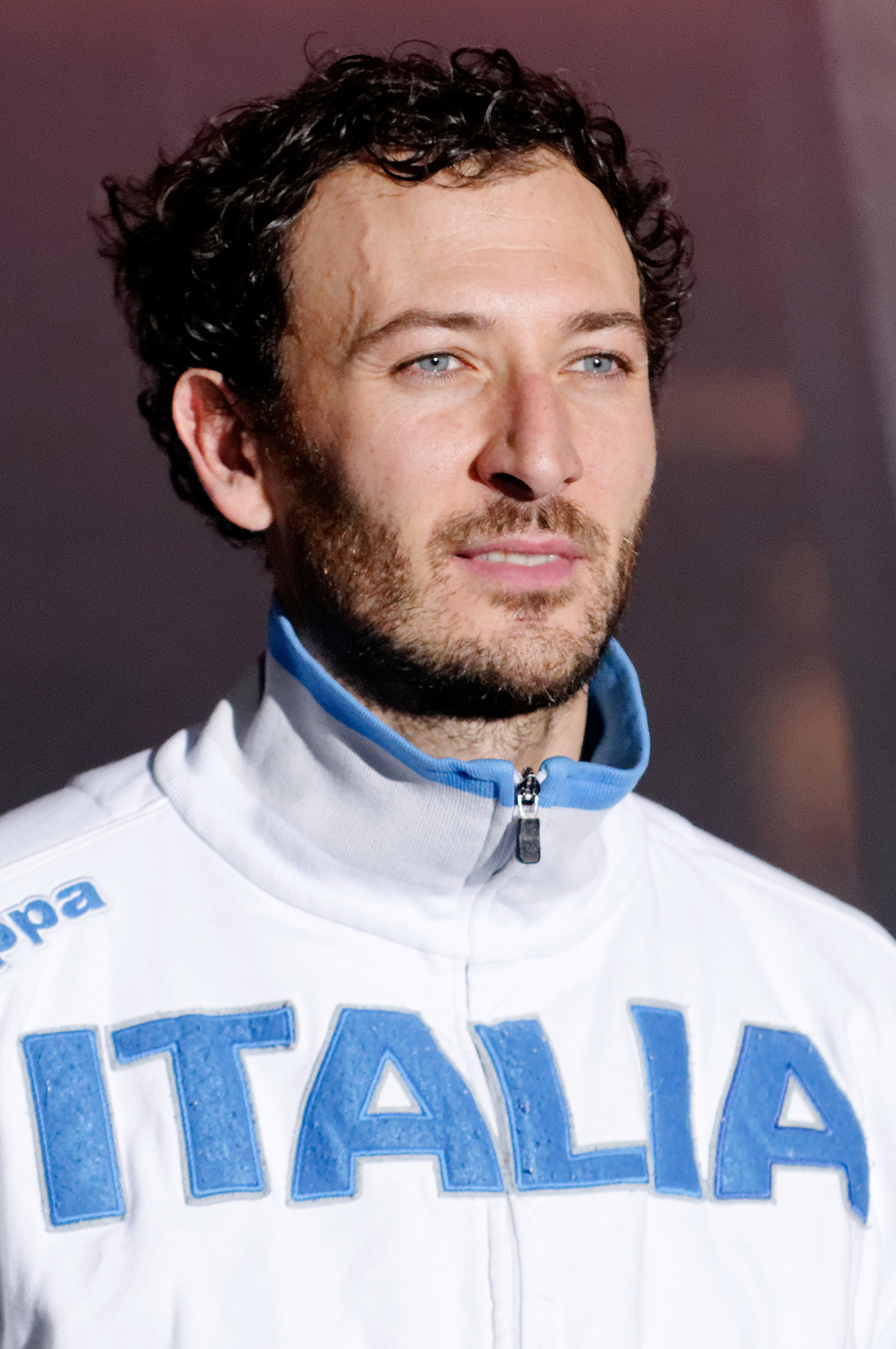

Personal information
- Born: 11 April 1979 (age 47) Bresso, Lombardy, Italy
- Height: 1.90 m (6 ft 3 in)
- Weight: 81 kg (179 lb)

Fencing career
- Sport: Fencing
- Weapon: épée
- Hand: right-handed
- National coach: Sandro Cuomo
- Club: CS Carabinieri
- Head coach: Luca Bellezze
- FIE ranking: current ranking
Medal record
Men's épée
Representing Italy
Olympic Games
Bronze medal – third place	2008 Beijing	Team
World Championships
Silver medal – second place	2007 St. Petersburg	Team
Bronze medal – third place	2007 St. Petersburg	Individual
European Championships
Bronze medal – third place	2006 İzmir	Team

Diego Confalonieri (born 11 April 1979) is a male Italian fencer. He won the bronze medal in the men's team épée event at the 2008 Summer Olympics.

== Record against selected opponents ==
Includes results from all competitions 2006–present and athletes who have reached the quarterfinals at the World Championships or Olympic Games, plus those who have medaled in major team competitions.

- (Hungary) Gábor Boczkó 1–0
- (Spain) Ignacio Canto 2–0
- (Portugal) Joaquim Videira 1–1
- (France) Érik Boisse 1–0
- (Ukraine) Dmytro Chumak 1–0
- (Switzerland) Marcel Fischer 0–1
- (Hungary) Géza Imre 2–1
- (France) Fabrice Jeannet 0–2
- (France) Jérôme Jeannet 1–1
- (Hungary) Krisztián Kulcsár 0–1
- (Cuba) Guillermo Madrigal Sardinas 0–1
- (France) Ulrich Robeiri 2–1
- (Italy) Alfredo Rota 0–1
- (Poland) Radosław Zawrotniak 1–1
- (Spain) José Luis Abajo 1–2
- (Russia) Anton Avdeev 1–2
- (Estonia) Sven Järve 1–0
- (Italy) Matteo Tagliariol 1–0
- (China) Yin Lian Chi 1–1
- (Belarus) Vitaly Zakharov 1–0
- (Italy) Stefano Carozzo 1–0
- (Venezuela) Silvio Fernández 0–1
- (Estonia) Nikolai Novosjolov 0–1
- (Romania) Alexandru Nyisztor 1–0
- (Poland) Tomasz Motyka 1–0
- (Germany) Martin Schmitt 0–1
- (Germany) Jörg Fiedler 1-0
