= Matteo Tagliariol =

Italian fencer

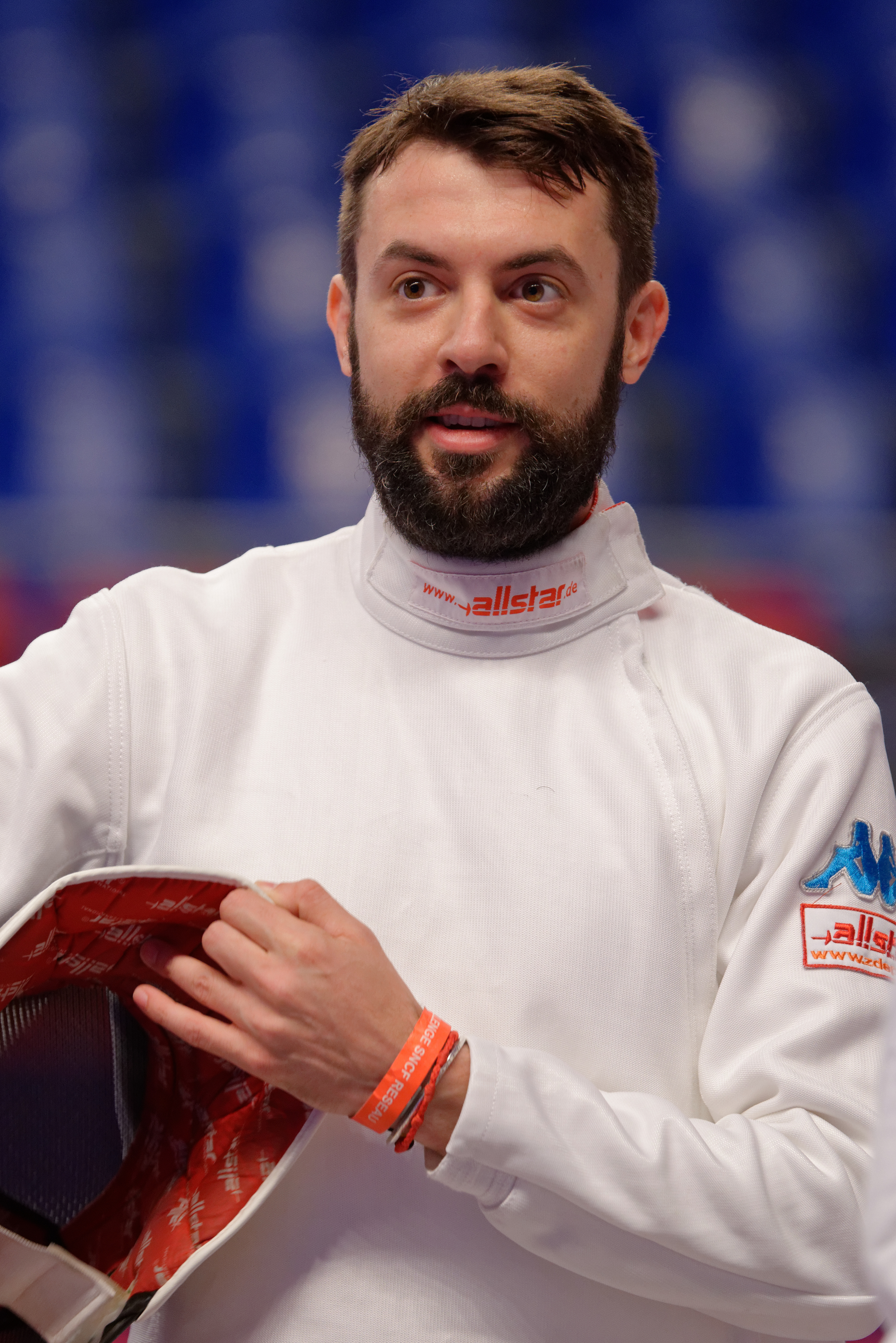

Personal information
- Born: 7 January 1983 (age 43) Treviso, Italy
- Height: 1.88 m (6 ft 2 in)
- Weight: 78 kg (172 lb)

Fencing career
- Sport: Fencing
- Weapon: épée
- Hand: right-handed
- National coach: Sandro Cuomo
- Club: Aeronautica Militare
- Head coach: Enrico Nicolini
- FIE ranking: current ranking
Medal record
Representing Italy
Men's Épée
Olympic Games
Gold medal – first place	2008 Beijing	Individual
Bronze medal – third place	2008 Beijing	Team
World Championships
Silver medal – second place	2007 Saint Petersburg	Team
Silver medal – second place	2009 Antalya	Individual

Matteo Tagliariol (born 7 January 1983 in Treviso) is an Italian right-handed épée fencer, 2008 team Olympic bronze medalist, and 2008 individual Olympic champion.

His fencing style has been described as "technical, simple, spontaneous, clear-sighted, inspired and efficient".

== Medal Record ==
=== Olympic Games ===
Year	Location	Event	Position
2008	Beijing, China	Individual Men's Épée	1st
2008	Beijing, China	Team Men's Épée	3rd

=== World Championship ===
Year	Location	Event	Position
2007	St. Petersburg, Russia	Team Men's Épée	2nd
2009	Antalya, Turkey	Individual Men's Épée	2nd

=== European Championship ===
Year	Location	Event	Position
2007	Ghent, Belgium	Individual Men's Épée	2nd
2008	Kyiv, Ukraine	Team Men's Épée	3rd
2009	Plovdiv, Bulgaria	Team Men's Épée	3rd

=== Grand Prix ===
Date	Location	Event	Position
2006-03-10	Stockholm, Sweden	Individual Men's Épée	3rd
2007-01-19	Doha, Qatar	Individual Men's Épée	3rd
2007-03-09	Stockholm, Sweden	Individual Men's Épée	3rd
2008-05-30	Montreal, Canada	Individual Men's Épée	1st
2013-03-23	Vancouver, Canada	Individual Men's Épée	1st

=== World Cup ===
Date	Location	Event	Position
2007-02-02	Legnano, Italy	Individual Men's Épée	2nd
2007-03-03	Berne, Switzerland	Individual Men's Épée	3rd
2007-06-08	Caguas, Puerto Rico	Individual Men's Épée	3rd
2008-02-16	Tallinn, Estonia	Individual Men's Épée	1st
2008-03-01	Berne, Switzerland	Individual Men's Épée	1st
2010-05-07	Paris, France	Individual Men's Épée	3rd
2011-01-14	Legnano, Italy	Individual Men's Épée	2nd
2011-03-18	Paris, France	Individual Men's Épée	1st
2011-04-29	Heidenheim, Germany	Individual Men's Épée	3rd

=== Satellite ===
Date	Location	Event	Position
2016-05-14	Split, Croatia	Individual Men's Épée	1st

== Record Against Selected Opponents ==
Includes results from all competitions 2006–present and athletes who have reached the quarterfinals at the World Championships or Olympic Games, plus those who have medaled in major team competitions.

- (Spain) José Luis Abajo 2–0
- (Venezuela) Silvio Fernández 3–1
- (Italy) Stefano Carozzo 3–0
- (Switzerland) Marcel Fischer 2–0
- (Hungary) Géza Imre 0–1
- (France) Jérôme Jeannet 1–2
- (Poland) Radosław Zawrotniak 1–0
- (Ukraine) Dmytro Chumak 2–0
- (Italy) Diego Confalonieri 0–1
- (United States) Weston Kelsey 1–0
- (Ukraine) Maksym Khvorost 1–0
- (Hungary) Krisztián Kulcsár 1–0
- (Italy) Alfredo Rota 1–1
- (China) Wang Lei 1–0
- (Russia) Anton Avdeev 0–1
- (Norway) Sturla Torkildsen 2–0
- (Netherlands) Bas Verwijlen 1–0
- (Portugal) Joaquim Videira 1–0
- (Hungary) Gábor Boczkó 1–0
- (Germany) Martin Schmitt 0-1
