= Fencing at 2013 World Combat Games – Men's Epee Individual =

The Fencing at the 2013 World Combat Games held in St. Petersburg, Russia from 24–26 October.

== Medalists ==
Gold	Silver	Bronze
Nikolai Novosjolov (EST)	Gábor Boczkó (HUN)	Ulrich Robeiri (FRA)

== Athletes list ==
- (Canada) Hugues Boisvert-Simard
- (Estonia) Nikolai Novosjolov
- (France) Iván Trevejo
- (France) Ulrich Robeiri
- (Hungary) Gábor Boczkó
- (Kazakhstan) Elmir Alimzhanov
- (South Korea) Song Jae-ho
- (Libya) Khaled Buhdeima
- (Poland) Radosław Zawrotniak
- (Russia) Pavel Sukhov
- (Russia) Anton Avdeev
- (Switzerland) Max Heinzer
- (Switzerland) Fabian Kauter
- (Ukraine) Bohdan Nikishyn
- (Venezuela) Silvio Fernández
- (Venezuela) Ruben Limardo

== Results ==
Round of 16
(France) Iván Trevejo	15
(Kazakhstan) Elmir Alimzhanov	6
(Russia) Pavel Sukhov	15
(Ukraine) Bogdan Nikishin	14
(Switzerland) Fabian Kauter	15
(South Korea) Song Jae-ho	11
(Canada) Hugues Boisvert-Simard	8
(Hungary) Gábor Boczkó	11
(Venezuela) Silvio Fernández	11
(Russia) Anton Avdeev	15
(Poland) Radoslaw Zawrotniak	14
(France) Ulrich Robeiri	15
(Venezuela) Rubén Limardo
(Libya) Khaled Buhdeima	w/o

Quarterfinals
(Estonia) Nikolai Novosjolov	15
(France) Iván Trevejo	8
(Russia) Pavel Sukhov	9
(Switzerland) Fabian Kauter	15
(Hungary) Gábor Boczkó	6
(Russia) Anton Avdeev	5
(France) Ulrich Robeiri	15
(Libya) Khaled Buhdeima	9

Semifinals
(Estonia) Nikolai Novosjolov	15
(Switzerland) Fabian Kauter	10
(Hungary) Gábor Boczkó	15
(France) Ulrich Robeiri	13

Final
(Estonia) Nikolai Novosjolov	15
(Hungary) Gábor Boczkó	6
