= Kim Seung-gu =

South Korean fencer

Personal information
- Nationality: South Korea
- Born: 20 May 1981 (age 45)
- Height: 176 cm (5 ft 9 in)
- Weight: 71 kg (157 lb)

Sport
- Sport: Fencing
- Event: Épée

Korean name
- Hangul: 김승구
- RR: Gim Seunggu
- MR: Kim Sŭnggu
Medal record
Asian Games
Gold medal – first place	2006 Doha	Team épée
Bronze medal – third place	2006 Doha	Épée

Kim Seung-gu (Korean: 김승구; born May 20, 1981) is a South Korean épée fencer. He won two medals (one gold and one silver), as a member of the South Korean fencing team, at the 2006 Asian Games in Doha, Qatar.

Kim represented South Korea at the 2008 Summer Olympics in Beijing, where he competed in two épée events. For his first event, the men's individual épée, Kim defeated South Africa's Sello Maduma in the first preliminary round, before losing out his next match to Hungary's Géza Imre, with a sudden death score of 14–15. Few days later, he joined with his fellow fencers and teammates Jung Jin-sun and Kim Won-jin, for the men's team épée. Kim and his team, however, lost the seventh place match to the Ukrainian team (led by Dmytro Chumak), with a total score of 39 touches.
