= Maksym Khvorost =

Ukrainian fencer (born 1982)

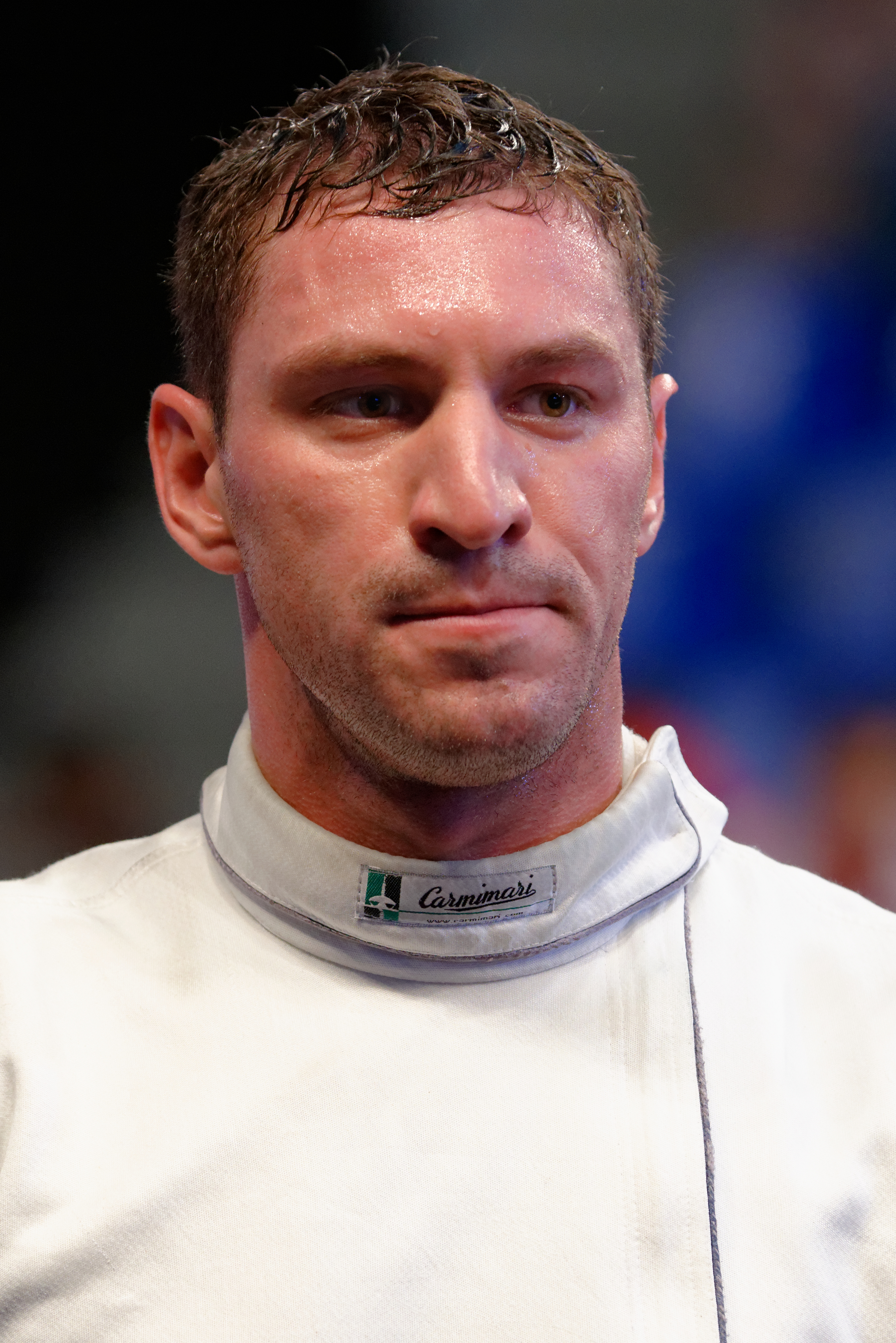
- Khvorost at the 2014 Challenge RFF (Paris World Cup)

Personal information
- Full name: Maksym Volodymyrovych Khvorost
- Nationality: Ukrainian
- Born: July 15, 1982 (age 43) Kharkiv, Ukrainian SSR, Soviet Union
- Height: 1.86 m (6 ft 1 in)
- Weight: 82 kg (181 lb)

Fencing career
- Sport: Fencing
- Weapon: épée
- Hand: right-handed
- Club: Dynamo Kharkiv
- FIE ranking: current ranking
Medal record
Men's épée fencing
Representing Ukraine
World Championships
Gold medal – first place	2015 Moscow	Team
Silver medal – second place	2003 Havana	Individual
Bronze medal – third place	2005 Leipzig	Team
Bronze medal – third place	2006 Turin	Team
European Championships
Gold medal – first place	2001 Coblenz	Team
Silver medal – second place	2010 Leipzig	Team
Silver medal – second place	2017 Tbilisi	Team
Bronze medal – third place	2012 Legnano	Team
Summer Universiade
Gold medal – first place	2003 Daegu	Team
Gold medal – first place	2007 Bangkok	Team
Silver medal – second place	2001 Beijing	Individual
Bronze medal – third place	2007 Bangkok	Individual
Bronze medal – third place	2009 Belgrade	Team

Maksym Khvorost (Ukrainian: Максим Володимирович Хворост; born 15 July 1982) is a Ukrainian épée fencer.

== Career ==
He competed in the individual and team épée events at the 2004 and 2008 Summer Olympics.

Khvorost won the bronze medal in the épée team event at the 2006 World Fencing Championships after beating Hungary in the bronze medal match. He accomplished this with his teammates Dmytro Karyuchenko, Dmytro Chumak and Bohdan Nikishyn.

== Record against selected opponents ==
Includes results from all competitions 2006–present and major competitions from pre - 2006. The list includes athletes who have reached the quarterfinals at the World Championships or Olympic Games, plus those who have earned medals in major team competitions.

- (France) Fabrice Jeannet 0–1
- (South Korea) Lee Sang Yup 0–1
- (Venezuela) Silvio Fernandez 2–0
- (Romania) Alexandru Nyisztor 0–3
- (Spain) Jose Luis Abajo 1–1
- (Hungary) Gábor Boczkó 0–1
- (Uzbekistan) Alexandr Filinov 3–0
- (France) Jérôme Jeannet 1–1
- (Hungary) Krisztián Kulcsár 0–2
- (Portugal) Joaquim Videira 2–0
- (Poland) Radosław Zawrotniak 2–1
- (Italy) Stefano Carozzo 3–0
- (Ukraine) Dmytro Chumak 1–0
- (Hungary) Géza Imre 2–2
- (Cuba) Guillermo Madrigal Sardinas 1–0
- (Italy) Alfredo Rota 1–0
- (Italy) Matteo Tagliariol 0–1
- (Canada) Igor Tikhomirov 0–1
- (Netherlands) Bas Verwijlen 1–0
- (France) Ulrich Robeiri 2–1
