= Gábor Boczkó =

Hungarian fencer (born 1977)

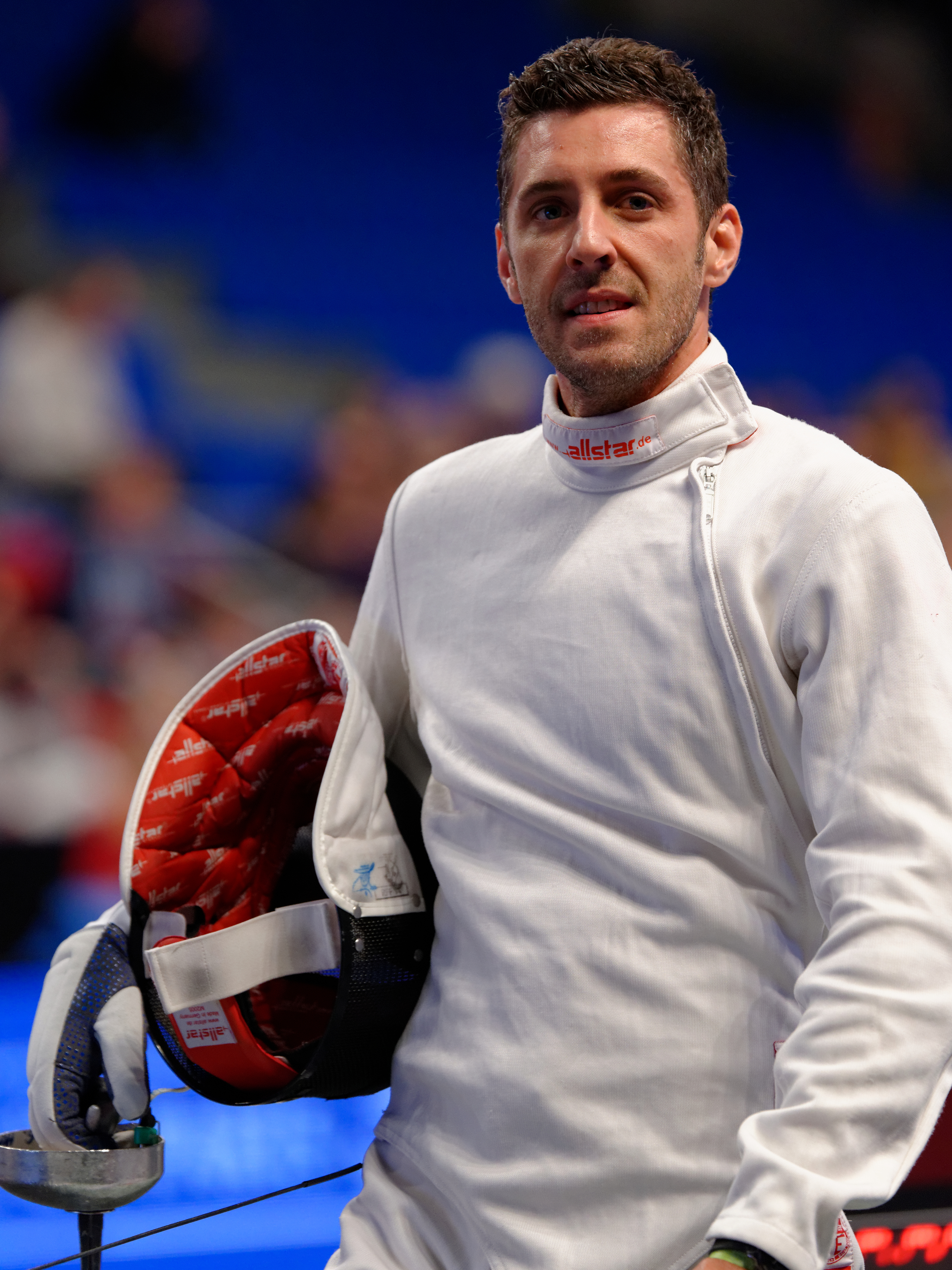
- Boczkó at the 2014 Challenge RFF (Paris World Cup)

Personal information
- Born: 1 April 1977 (age 49) Tapolca, Hungary
- Height: 1.92 m (6 ft 4 in)
- Weight: 89 kg (196 lb)

Fencing career
- Sport: Fencing
- Country: Hungary
- Weapon: épée
- Hand: right-handed
- Club: Tapolcai Bauxit (–1996); Bp. Honvéd (1997–)
- Head coach: István Móna; Győző Kulcsár
- FIE ranking: current ranking
Medal record
Men's fencing
Representing Hungary
Event	1st	2nd	3rd
Olympic Games	0	1	1
World Championships	1	2	4
European Championships	7	5	3
Universiade	0	1	1
Total	8	9	9
Olympic Games
Silver medal – second place	2004 Athens	Team épée
Bronze medal – third place	2016 Rio de Janeiro	Team épée
World Championships
Gold medal – first place	2013 Budapest	Team épée
Silver medal – second place	2011 Catania	Team épée
Bronze medal – third place	2010 Paris	Épée
Bronze medal – third place	2010 Paris	Team épée
European Championships
Silver medal – second place	2010 Leipzig	Épée
Silver medal – second place	2012 Legnano	Team épée
Silver medal – second place	2013 Zagreb	Team épée

Gábor Boczkó (born 1 April 1977) is a Hungarian fencer, who won a silver medal in the team Épée competition at the 2004 Summer Olympics in Athens together with Krisztián Kulcsár, Géza Imre and Iván Kovács.

Boczkó took up fencing after his father took him to a competition in Tapolca. His first coach was Kinga Borosné Eitner.

== Medal record (Individual) ==
=== World Championship ===
Date	Location	Event	Position
2010-11-05	Paris, France	Individual Men's Épée	3rd

=== European Championships ===
Date	Location	Event	Position
2009-07-13	Plovdiv, Bulgaria	Individual Men's Épée	3rd
2010-07-16	Leipzig, Germany	Individual Men's Épée	2nd
2015-06-07	Montreux, Switzerland	Individual Men's Épée	3rd

=== Grand Prix ===
Date	Location	Event	Position
2004-02-07	Barcelona, Spain	Individual Men's Épée	2nd
2006-01-27	Kuwait City, Kuwait	Individual Men's Épée	3rd
2006-04-28	Heidenheim an der Brenz, Germany	Individual Men's Épée	3rd
2006-06-16	Carolina, Puerto Rico	Individual Men's Épée	2nd
2007-05-11	Paris, France	Individual Men's Épée	1st
2007-06-01	Montreal, Canada	Individual Men's Épée	1st
2008-01-25	Kuwait City, Kuwait	Individual Men's Épée	3rd
2009-01-16	Kuwait City, Kuwait	Individual Men's Épée	3rd
2013-01-18	Doha, Qatar	Individual Men's Épée	1st
2013-03-23	Vancouver, Canada	Individual Men's Épée	3rd
2016-03-18	Budapest, Hungary	Individual Men's Épée	3rd

=== World Cup ===
Date	Location	Event	Position
2004-02-21	Budapest, Hungary	Individual Men's Épée	3rd
2005-05-06	Legnano, Italy	Individual Men's Épée	2nd
2006-05-05	Legnano, Italy	Individual Men's Épée	3rd
2006-07-15	Tehran, Iran	Individual Men's Épée	1st
2007-06-15	Bogotá, Colombia	Individual Men's Épée	1st
2009-03-27	Paris, France	Individual Men's Épée	2nd
2009-05-09	Heidenheim an der Brenz, Germany	Individual Men's Épée	3rd
2010-03-26	Heidenheim an der Brenz, Germany	Individual Men's Épée	3rd
2011-01-14	Legnano, Italy	Individual Men's Épée	3rd
2015-05-01	Paris, France	Individual Men's Épée	2nd

== Record against selected opponents ==
Includes results from all competitions 2006 – present and major competitions from pre – 2006. The list includes athletes who have reached the quarterfinals at the World Championships or Olympic Games, plus those who have earned medals in major team competitions.

- (Italy) Diego Confalonieri 0–1
- (Netherlands) Bas Verwijlen 3–1
- (Belarus) Vitaly Zakharov 3–0
- (Spain) Jose Luis Abajo 3–1
- (Russia) Anton Avdeev 1–1
- (France) Érik Boisse 1–0
- (Italy) Stefano Carozzo 3–0
- (Hungary) Géza Imre 3–2
- (France) Fabrice Jeannet 1–1
- (Ukraine) Maksym Khvorost 1–1
- (Poland) Tomasz Motyka 1–1
- (France) Ulrich Robeiri 1–2
- (China) Yin Lian Chi 0–1
- (Hungary) Krisztián Kulcsár 1–0
- (Italy) Alfredo Rota 2–0
- (Portugal) Joaquim Videira 0–1
- (Poland) Radosław Zawrotniak 2–1
- (Spain) Ignacio Canto 1–0
- (Poland) Robert Andrzejuk 1–0
- (Ukraine) Dmitriy Karuchenko 1–1
- (Ukraine) Bogdan Nikishin 0–3
- (Venezuela) Silvio Fernández 1–0
- (France) Jérôme Jeannet 1–0

== Awards ==
- Hungarian Junior fencer of the Year (1): 1996
- Masterly youth athlete: 1997
- Hungarian Fencer of the Year (4): 2002, 2008, 2010, 2013
- Hungarian Fair Play Award (2014)

Orders and special awards

- Order of Merit of the Republic of Hungary – Knight's Cross (2004)
- Order of Merit of Hungary – Officer's Cross (2016)
