= Wolfgang Mejías =

Venezuelan fencer (born 1983)

Personal information
- Full name: Wolfgang Eduardo Mejías
- Nationality: Venezuela
- Born: 14 March 1983 (age 43) Caracas, Distrito Capital, Venezuela
- Height: 1.76 m (5 ft 9 1/2 in)
- Weight: 71 kg (157 lb)

Sport
- Sport: Fencing
- Event: Épée

Wolfgang Eduardo Mejías (born March 14, 1983, in Caracas, Distrito Capital) is a Venezuelan épée fencer. Mejias represented Venezuela at the 2008 Summer Olympics in Beijing, where he competed in two épée events.

For his first event, the men's individual épée, Mejias lost the first preliminary match to Norway's Sturla Torkildsen, with a sudden death score of 11–12. Few days later, he joined with his fellow fencers and teammates Francesco Limardo, Silvio Fernández, and Rubén Limardo, for the men's team épée. Although he was considered an alternate, Mejias and his team lost the fifth place match to the Hungarian team (led by Géza Imre), with a total score of 25 touches.
