= Jérôme Jeannet =

French fencer (born 1977)

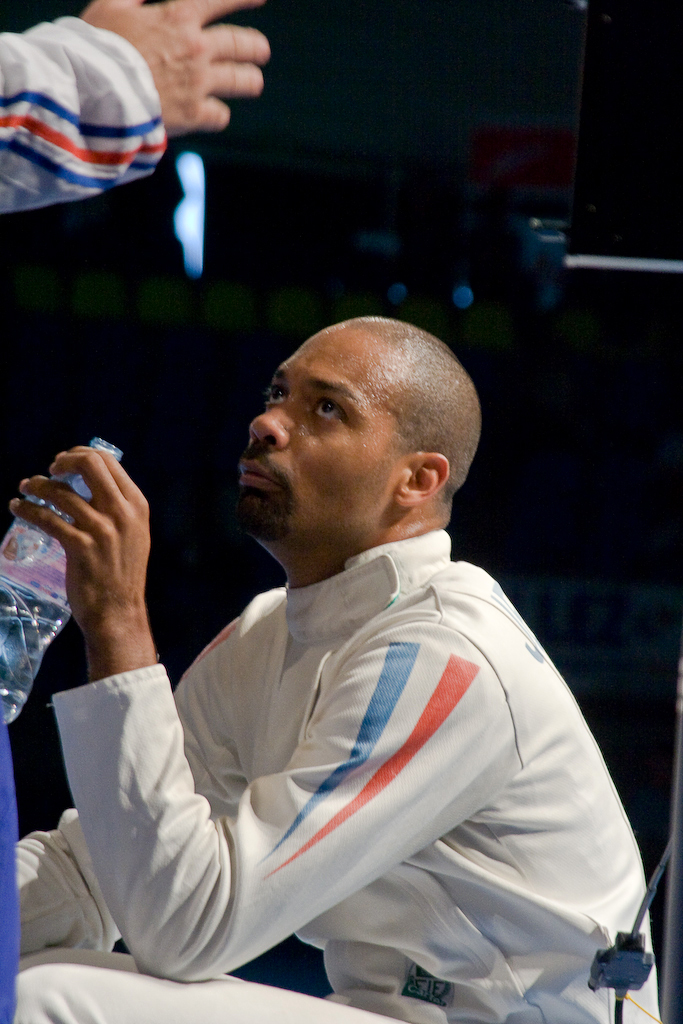
- Jérôme Jeannet

Personal information
- Born: 26 January 1977 (age 49) Fort-de-France, Martinique

Sport
- Sport: Fencing
Medal record
Men's fencing
Representing France
Olympic Games
Gold medal – first place	2004 Athens	Team épée
Gold medal – first place	2008 Beijing	Team épée
World Championships
Gold medal – first place	2005 Leipzig	Team épée
Gold medal – first place	2007 Saint Petersburg	Team épée
Gold medal – first place	2009 Antalya	Team épée
Gold medal – first place	2010 Paris	Team Épée
Bronze medal – third place	2001 Nîmes	Team épée
Bronze medal – third place	2007 Saint Petersburg	Épée
Bronze medal – third place	2009 Antalya	Épée

Jérôme Jeannet (born 26 January 1977 in Fort-de-France, Martinique) is a French épée fencer.

His brother, Fabrice Jeannet is also a fencer.

== Record against selected opponents ==
Includes results from all competitions 2006–present and major competitions from pre - 2006. The list includes athletes who have reached the quarterfinals at the World Championships or Olympic Games, plus those who have earned medals in major team competitions.

- (Russia) Anton Avdeev 1-0
- (France) Érik Boisse 1-2
- (Italy) Stefano Carozzo 2-1
- (Ukraine) Dmytro Chumak 2-0
- (Italy) Diego Confalonieri 1-1
- (Hungary) Géza Imre 1-1
- (Ukraine) Maksym Khvorost 2-0
- (Poland) Tomasz Motyka 2-1
- (Ukraine) Bogdan Nikishin 0-1
- (France) Ulrich Robeiri 1-2
- (Italy) Matteo Tagliariol 2-1
- (Belarus) Vitali Zakhrov 1-0
- (Poland) Radosław Zawrotniak 1-0
- (France) Fabrice Jeannet 1-1
- (Russia) Pavel Kolobkov 0-1
- (Cuba) Guillermo Madrigal Sardinas 1-0
- (Italy) Alfredo Rota 1-1
- (Estonia) Sven Järve 0-1
- (Romania) Alexandru Nyisztor 1-0
- (Netherlands) Bas Verwijlen 1-0
- (Spain) Juan Castañeda Cortes 1-0
- (China) Yin Lian Chi 1-0
- (Estonia) Nikolai Novosjolov 1-1
- (Spain) Jose Luis Abajo 0-1
- (Poland) Robert Andrzejuk 1-1
