= Mike Wood (fencer) =

South African fencer

Personal information
- Full name: Michael Brian Wood
- Nationality: South Africa
- Born: 8 February 1971 (age 55) Durban, South Africa
- Height: 1.82 m (5 ft 11 1/2 in)
- Weight: 77 kg (170 lb)

Sport
- Sport: Fencing
- Event: Épée
- Club: Tyshler Fencing School

Michael Brian Wood (born 8 February 1971 in Durban) is a South African épée fencer. At age thirty-seven, Wood made his official debut for the 2008 Summer Olympics in Beijing, where he competed in two épée events. He is also the husband of Elvira Wood, who qualified for the women's sabre at these Olympic games.

For his first event, the men's individual épée, Wood lost the first preliminary match to Ukraine's Bohdan Nikishyn, with a score of 7–15. A few days later, he joined with his fellow fencers and teammates Sello Maduma and Dario Torrente, for the men's team épée. Wood and his team, however, lost the preliminary round of sixteen match to the Chinese team (led by Li Guojie), with a total score of 28 touches.
