= Fencing at the 2008 Summer Olympics =

Fencing at the Games of the XXIX Olympiad
- Venue: Olympic Green Convention Center
- Dates: August 9 – 17

Fencing competitions at the Beijing 2008 Summer Olympics were held from August 9 to August 17 at the Olympic Green Convention Center.

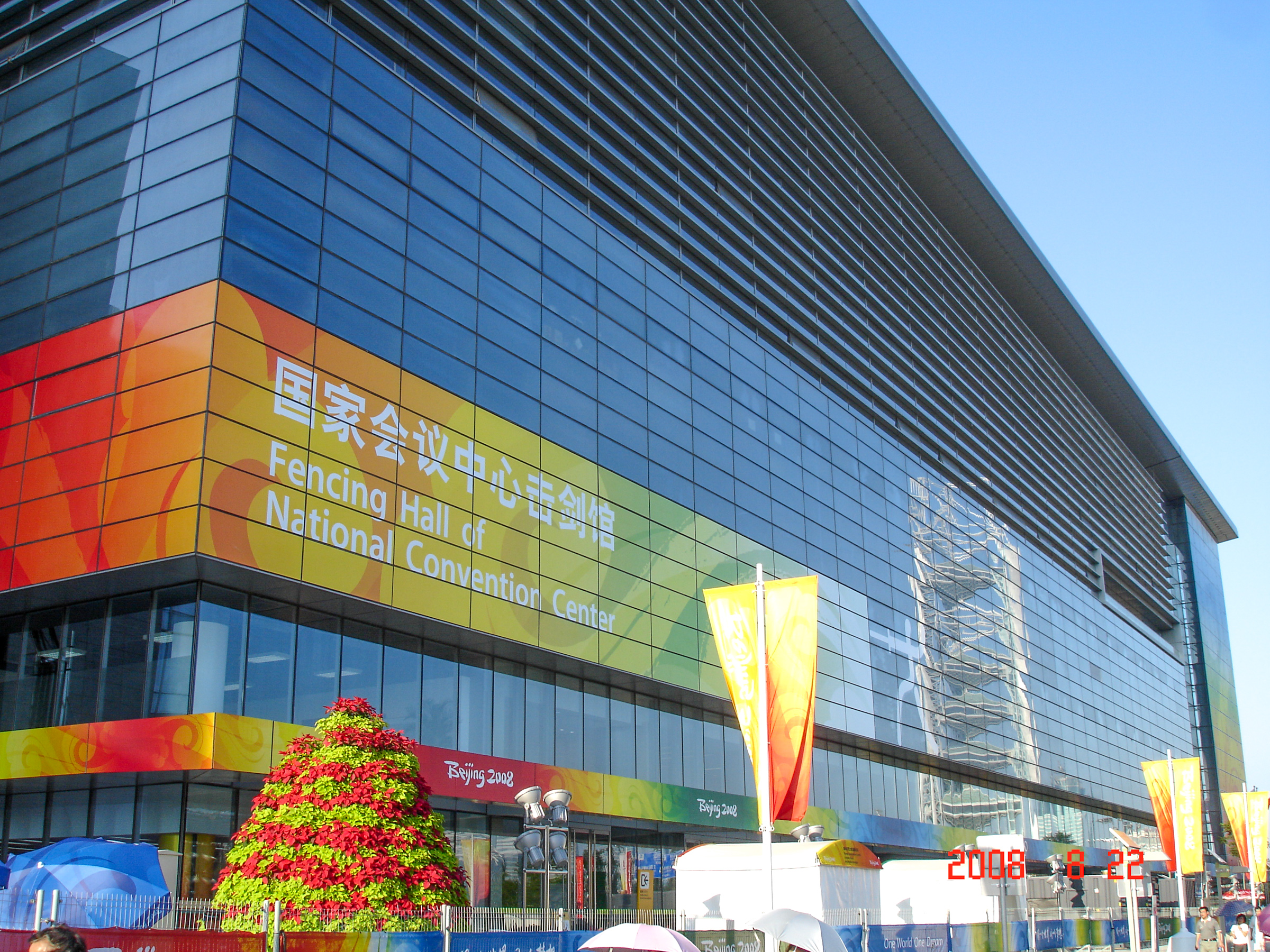
Fencing hall at the China National Convention Center

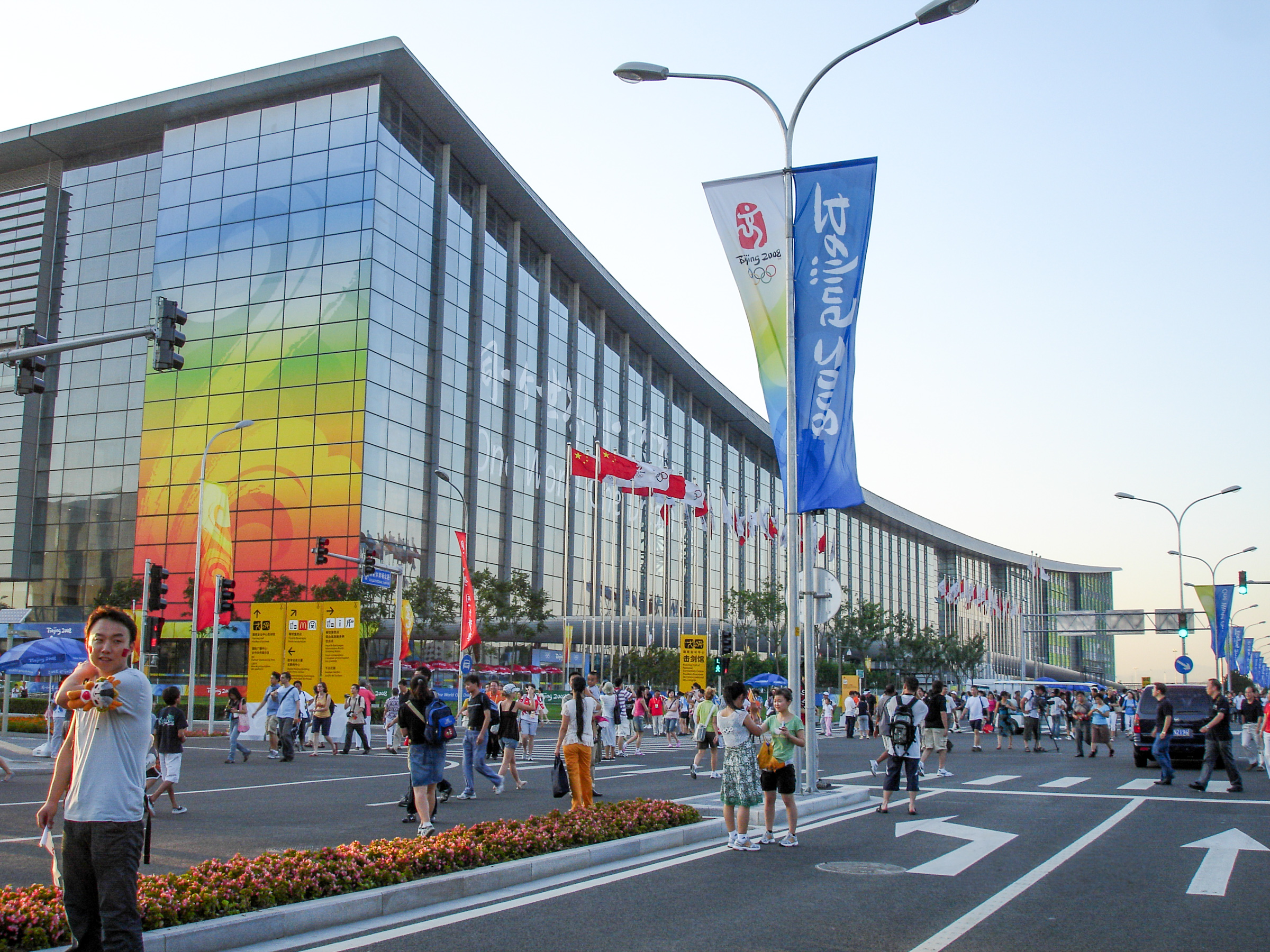
Fencing hall at the China National Convention Center

== Medal summary ==
=== Medal table ===
Rank	Nation	Gold	Silver	Bronze	Total
1	France	2	2	0	4
2	Italy	2	0	5	7
3	Germany	2	0	0	2
4	United States	1	3	2	6
5	China	1	1	0	2
6	Russia	1	0	0	1
6	Ukraine	1	0	0	1
8	Romania	0	1	1	2
9	Japan	0	1	0	1
9	Poland	0	1	0	1
9	South Korea	0	1	0	1
12	Hungary	0	0	1	1
12	Spain	0	0	1	1
Totals (13 entries)		10	10	10	30

=== Men's events ===
Games	Gold	Silver	Bronze
Individual Épée	Matteo Tagliariol; Italy	Fabrice Jeannet; France	José Luis Abajo; Spain
Team épée	France; Fabrice Jeannet; Jérôme Jeannet; Ulrich Robeiri	Poland; Robert Andrzejuk; Tomasz Motyka; Adam Wiercioch; Radosław Zawrotniak	Italy; Stefano Carozzo; Diego Confalonieri; Alfredo Rota; Matteo Tagliariol
Individual foil	Benjamin Kleibrink; Germany	Yuki Ota; Japan	Salvatore Sanzo; Italy
Individual sabre	Zhong Man; China	Nicolas Lopez; France	Mihai Covaliu; Romania
Team sabre	France; Julien Pillet; Boris Sanson; Nicolas Lopez	United States; Tim Morehouse; Jason Rogers; Keeth Smart; James Williams	Italy; Aldo Montano; Luigi Tarantino; Giampiero Pastore; Diego Occhiuzzi

=== Women's events ===
Games	Gold	Silver	Bronze
Individual Épée	Britta Heidemann; Germany	Ana Maria Brânză; Romania	Ildikó Mincza-Nébald; Hungary
Individual foil	Valentina Vezzali; Italy	Nam Hyun-Hee; South Korea	Margherita Granbassi; Italy
Team foil	Russia; Svetlana Boyko; Aida Chanaeva; Victoria Nikichina; Evgenia Lamonova	United States; Emily Cross; Hanna Thompson; Erinn Smart	Italy; Valentina Vezzali; Giovanna Trillini; Margherita Granbassi; Ilaria Salvatori
Individual sabre	Mariel Zagunis; United States	Sada Jacobson; United States	Becca Ward; United States
Team sabre	Ukraine; Olha Zhovnir; Olga Kharlan; Halyna Pundyk; Olena Khomrova	China; Bao Yingying; Huang Haiyang; Ni Hong; Tan Xue	United States; Sada Jacobson; Becca Ward; Mariel Zagunis

== Events ==
Ten sets of medals were awarded in the following events:

- Individual Épée Men
- Individual Épée Women
- Individual Foil Men
- Individual Foil Women
- Individual Sabre Men
- Individual Sabre Women
- Team Épée Men
- Team Foil Women
- Team Sabre Men
- Team Sabre Women

== Competition format ==
The Fencing competition at the Olympic Games consists of a single elimination tournament. The 2 losers in the semifinal will fence for the bronze medal.

== Participating nations ==
Nation	Men's Individual Épée	Men's Team Épée	Men's Individual Foil	Men's Individual Sabre	Men's Team Sabre	Women's Individual Épée	Women's Individual Foil	Women's Team Foil	Women's Individual Sabre	Women's Team Sabre	Total
Algeria						1	1				2
Argentina			1								1
Australia						1	1				2
Austria			1								1
Belarus				3	X						3
Brazil			1	1							2
Burkina Faso				1							1
Canada	1		1	1		1	1		3	X (1)	9
Chile	1										1
China	3	X (1)	2	3	X (1)	2	3	X (1)	3	X (1)	20
Cuba							1		1		2
Egypt	1		1	3	X (1)	1	3	X			10
Estonia	1										1
France	3	X	2	3	X	2	1		3	X (1)	15
Germany			2	1		2	3	X	1		9
Great Britain			1	1			1				3
Hong Kong			1			1			1		3
Hungary	3	X (1)		3	X (1)	2	3	X(1)	1		15
Ireland									1		1
Israel			1			1	1				3
Italy	3	X (1)	2	3	X (1)		3	X (1)	2		16
Japan	1		2	1		1	1		1		7
Kyrgyzstan	1										1
Mexico									1		1
Morocco	1		1								2
Netherlands	1						1				2
Norway	1										1
Panama						1					1
Peru							1				1
Poland	3	X (1)	1	1			3	X (1)	3	X	13
Portugal	1						1				2
Qatar			1								1
Romania			1	2		1	1				5
Russia	1			3	X	2	3	X (1)	3	X (1)	14
Senegal				2					1		3
South Africa	3	X							3	X (1)	7
South Korea	3	X	1	1		1	2		2		10
Spain	1		1	2					1		5
Sweden						1					1
Switzerland	1					1					2
Thailand			1	1							2
Tunisia							1		1		2
Ukraine	3	X (1)				1	1		3	X (1)	10
United States	1		1	3	X (1)	1	3	X	3	X	13
Venezuela	3	X		1		1	1		1		7
Total athletes	41	32	26	40	29	25	41	29	39	30	233
Total NOCs	23	9	21	21	8	20	24	8	21	8	45

== See also ==
- Wheelchair fencing at the 2008 Summer Paralympics
