= Men's team épée at the 2010 World Fencing Championships =

The men's team épée took place on November 13 at the Grand Palais, it was the last event of the championship.

== Teams ==
34 teams competed.

| Country | World Ranking |
|---|---|
| Hungary | 1 |
| South Korea | 2 |
| Poland | 3 |
| China | 4 |
| France | 5 |
| Italy | 6 |
| Ukraine | 7 |
| Germany | 8 |
| Spain | 9 |
| Switzerland | 10 |
| Canada | 11 |
| Russia | 12 |
| United States | 13 |
| Venezuela | 14 |
| Norway | 15 |
| Estonia | 16 |
| Kazakhstan | 19 |
| Japan | 20 |
| Hong Kong | 22 |
| Portugal | 23 |
| South Africa | 24 |
| Iran | 27 |
| Senegal | 28 |
| Czech Republic | 29 |
| Australia | 30 |
| Colombia | 33 |
| Côte d'Ivoire | 33 |
| Qatar | 35 |
| Israel | 37 |
| Brazil | 40 |
| Netherlands | 52 |
| Turkey | 58 |
| Sierra Leone | NR |

== Results ==
| Position | Country | Names |
|---|---|---|
| 1. | United States | Benjamin Bratton; Weston Kelsey; Cody Mattern; Benjamin (Benji) Ungar |
| 2. | France | Gauthier Grumier; Jérôme Jeannet; Jean-Michel Lucenay; Ulrich Robeiri |
| 3. | Hungary | Gábor Boczkó; Géza Imre; András Rédli; Péter Somfai |
| 4. | Russia | Sergey Khodos; Anton Avdeev; Pavel Sukhov; Alexey Tikhomirov |
| 5. | Germany | |
| 6. | Ukraine | |
| 7. | Poland | |
| 8. | South Korea | |

Quarter-finals
Hungary | 45
Germany | 37
United States | 39
South Korea | 35
Poland | 43
Russia | 45
Ukraine | 38
France | 45

Semi-finals
Hungary | 38
United States | 45
Russia | 38
France | 45

Final
United States | 44
France | 37
Third place
Hungary | 36
Russia | 34
