= Wiercioch =

Wiercioch is Polish surname. Notable people with the surname include:

- Adam Wiercioch (born 1980), Polish fencer
- Patrick Wiercioch (born 1990), Canadian ice hockey player
