= SK Njård =

Norwegian sports club

SK Njård is a Norwegian multi-sports club from Vestre Aker, Oslo. It is named after Njörðr in Norse mythology.

Founded in 1924, it has sections for alpine skiing, fencing, team handball, cross-country skiing, tennis, gymnastics, and rhythmic gymnastics, orienteering together with IL Heming (as Heming/Njård), and has also had sections for bandy and basketball. Its arena Njårdhallen is used for indoor sports.

Its women's handball team plays in the second highest Norwegian league. Their most famous player was goalkeeper Jeanette Nilsen. Skiers in Njård include Celine Brun-Lie. Also, 2008 Olympic fencer Sturla Torkildsen represents the club.
