= Sello Maduma =

South African fencer

Personal information
- Full name: Sello Given Maduma
- Nationality: South Africa
- Born: 26 April 1987 (age 39) Mamelodi, Gauteng, South Africa
- Height: 1.87 m (6 ft 1 1/2 in)
- Weight: 74 kg (163 lb)

Sport
- Sport: Fencing
- Event: Épée
- Club: Mamelodi Fencing Club

Sello Given Maduma (born 26 April 1987 in Mamelodi, Gauteng) is a South African épée fencer. Maduma represented South Africa at the 2008 Summer Olympics in Beijing and London 2012 fencing where he faced David Haye, where he competed in two épée events.

For his first event, the men's individual épée, Maduma lost the first preliminary match to South Korea's Kim Seung Gu, with a score of 12–15. Few days later, he joined with his fellow fencers and teammates Mike Wood and Dario Torrente, for the men's team épée. Maduma and his team, however, lost the preliminary round of sixteen match to the Chinese team (led by Li Guojie), with a total score of 28 touches.
