= Men's team épée at the 2014 World Fencing Championships =

The Men's team épée event of the 2014 World Fencing Championships was held from 22–23 July 2014.

== Medalists ==
| Gold | France; Gauthier Grumier; Daniel Jerent; Jean-Michel Lucenay; Ulrich Robeiri |
| Silver | South Korea; Jung Jin-sun; Kwon Young-jun; Park Kyoung-doo; Park Sang-young |
| Bronze | Switzerland; Peer Borsky; Max Heinzer; Fabian Kauter; Benjamin Steffen |

== Draw ==
=== Finals ===
| Final |
| France | 45 |
| South Korea | 39 |

| Third place |
| Switzerland | 23 |
| Russia | 21 |

=== Top half ===
Round of 32
Switzerland | 45
Netherlands | 29
Germany | 44
Estonia | 41
Venezuela | 45
Argentina | 38
Denmark | 45
China | 39
Italy | 45
Uzbekistan | 38
Hong Kong | 35
Czech Republic | 45
Israel | 45
Canada | 43
Iran | 32
France | 45

Round of 16
Switzerland | 45
Germany | 32
Venezuela | 38
Denmark | 45
Italy | 45
Czech Republic | 33
Israel | 29
France | 45

Quarterfinals
Switzerland | 45
Denmark | 37
Italy | 36
France | 45

Semifinals
Switzerland | 24
France | 31

=== Bottom half ===
Round of 32
Ukraine | 45
Mexico | 22
Kyrgyzstan | 45
Egypt | 42
United States | 33
Japan | 34
Brazil | 26
South Korea | 45
Poland | 45
Cuba | 37
Finland | 39
Russia | 45
Kazakhstan | 42
Spain | 43
Chile | 21
Hungary | 45

Round of 16
Ukraine | 43
Kyrgyzstan | 38
Japan | 39
South Korea | 45
Poland | 31
Russia | 45
Spain | 42
Hungary | 45

Quarterfinals
Ukraine | 31
South Korea | 45
Russia | 45
Hungary | 40

Semifinals
South Korea | 45
Russia | 41

=== Placement rounds ===
==== 5–8th place ====
5–8th place semifinals
Denmark | 41
Italy | 45
Ukraine | 44
Hungary | 43

5th place
Italy | 26
Ukraine | 28
7th place
Denmark | 45
Hungary | 30

==== 9–16th place ====
9–16th place quarterfinals
Germany | 43
Venezuela | 29
Czech Republic | 36
Israel | 32
Kyrgyzstan | 40
Japan | 45
Poland | 45
Spain | 23

9–12th place semifinals
Germany | 45
Czech Republic | 43
Japan | 34
Poland | 37

9th place
Germany | 35
Poland | 45
11th place
Czech Republic | 45
Japan | 34

==== 13–16th place ====
13–16th place semifinals
Venezuela | 32
Israel | 33
Kyrgyzstan | 45
Spain | 39

13th place
Israel | 45
Kyrgyzstan | 36
15th place
Venezuela | 35
Spain | 45

== Final classification ==
| Rank | Nation |
|---|---|
| 1st place, gold medalist(s) | France |
| 2nd place, silver medalist(s) | South Korea |
| 3rd place, bronze medalist(s) | Switzerland |
| 4 | Russia |
| 5 | Ukraine |
| 6 | Italy |
| 7 | Denmark |
| 8 | Hungary |
| 9 | Poland |
| 10 | Germany |
| 11 | Czech Republic |
| 12 | Japan |
| 13 | Israel |
| 14 | Kyrgyzstan |
| 15 | Spain |
| 16 | Venezuela |
| 17 | China |
| 18 | United States |
| 19 | Egypt |
| 20 | Estonia |
| 21 | Canada |
| 22 | Hong Kong |
| 23 | Finland |
| 24 | Argentina |
| 25 | Cuba |
| 26 | Venezuela |
| 27 | Brazil |
| 28 | Uzbekistan |
| 29 | Iran |
| 30 | Mexico |
| 31 | Netherlands |
| 32 | Chile |
| 33 | South Africa |
| 34 | Sweden |
| 35 | Costa Rica |
| 36 | Mongolia |
