= Michael Kauter =

Swiss épée fencer (born 1979)

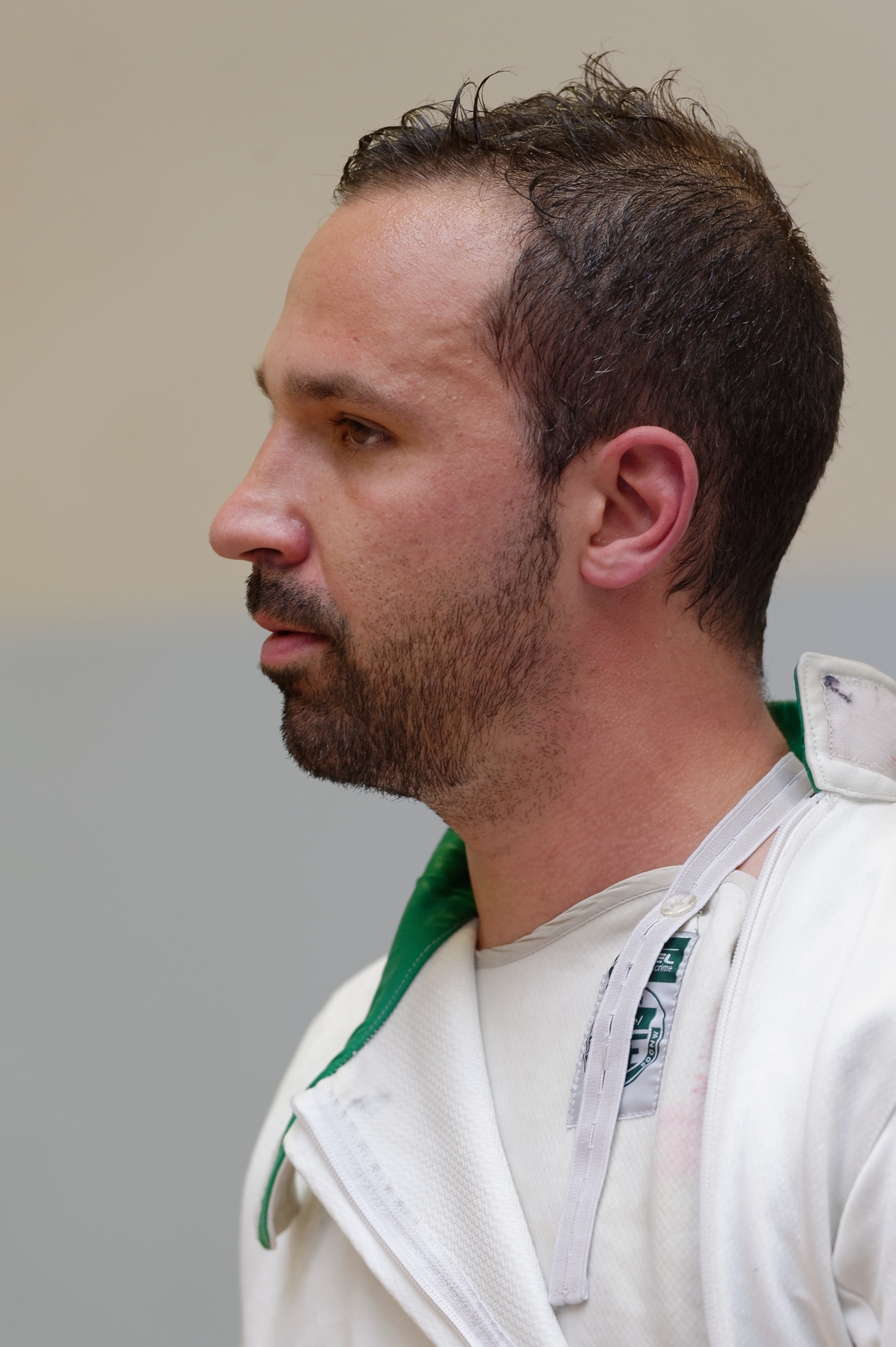

Personal information
- Nationality: Switzerland
- Born: 18 February 1979 (age 47) Bern, Switzerland
- Height: 1.88 m (6 ft 2 in)
- Weight: 82 kg (181 lb)

Sport
- Sport: Fencing
- Event: Épée
- Club: Fechtclub Bern

Michael Kauter (born February 18, 1979, in Bern) is a Swiss épée fencer. He won a bronze medal in the weapon at the 2008 European Fencing Championships in Kyiv, Ukraine. He is the son of Christian Kauter, a medalist at the 1972 Summer Olympics in Munich and at the 1976 Summer Olympics in Montreal in épée, and the brother of Fabian Kauter, an Olympic fencer in the same weapon.

Kauter represented Switzerland at the 2008 Summer Olympics in Beijing, where he competed in the men's individual épée event. He defeated Ukraine's Bohdan Nikishyn in the preliminary round of thirty-two, before losing his next match to Netherlands' Bas Verwijlen, with a score of 13–15.
