= Sturla Torkildsen =

Norwegian fencer

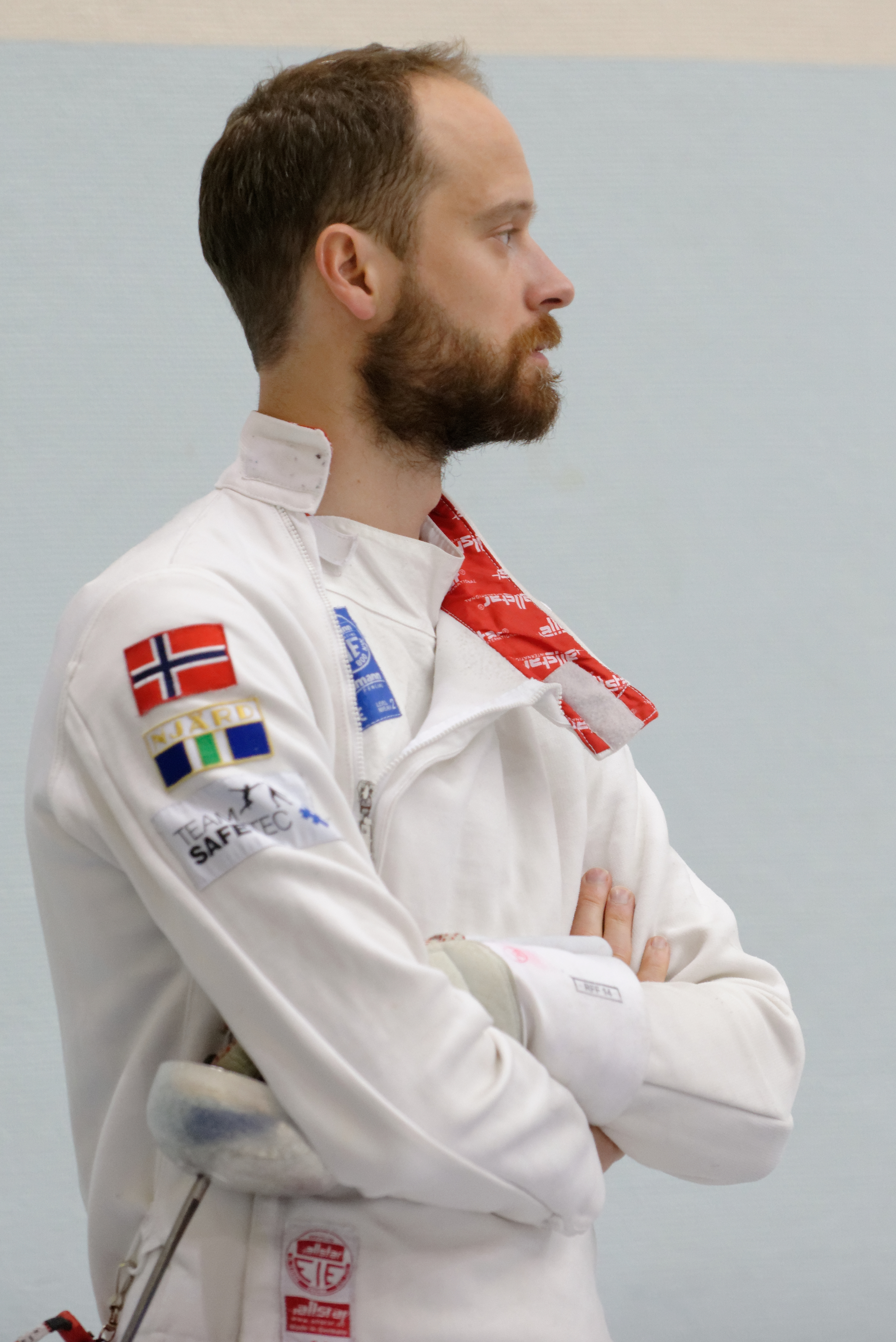
- At Challenge RFF-Trophée Monal 2014

Personal information
- Full name: Sturla Andreas Blanck Torkildsen
- Nationality: Norway
- Born: 18 July 1981 (age 44) Oslo, Norway
- Height: 1.93 m (6 ft 4 in)
- Weight: 85 kg (187 lb)

Fencing career
- Sport: Fencing
- Weapon: Épée
- Hand: left-handed
- Club: Njård
- FIE ranking: current ranking

Sturla Andreas Blanck Torkildsen (born 18 July 1981 in Oslo) is a Norwegian épée fencer. Torkildsen represented Norway at the 2008 Summer Olympics in Beijing, where he competed in the men's individual épée event. He first defeated Venezuela's Wolfgang Mejías in the preliminary round of sixty-four, before losing out his next match to Italy's Matteo Tagliariol, with a score of 10–15.

Torkildsen is a member of Njård, a local fencing club in Oslo, and is also a graduate of law at the University of Oslo.
