= Adam Wiercioch =

Polish fencer (born 1980)

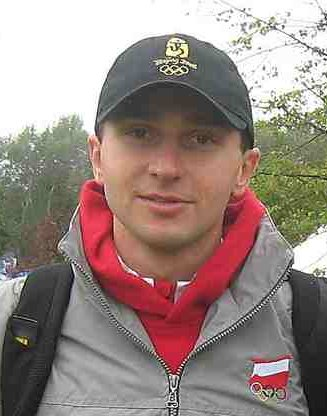

Medal record

Men's fencing

Representing Poland

Olympic Games
Silver medal – second place	2008 Beijing	Team Épée

Adam Andrzej Wiercioch (born 1 November 1980) is a Polish fencer who won a silver medal in Men's Team Épée (Fencing) at the 2008 Summer Olympics in Beijing, together with Tomasz Motyka, Radosław Zawrotniak, and Robert Andrzejuk.

For his sport achievements, he received:
Golden Cross of Merit in 2008.

== See also ==
- List of Pennsylvania State University Olympians
