= Bohdan Nikishyn =

Ukrainian épée fencer

Bohdan Serhiyovych Nikishyn
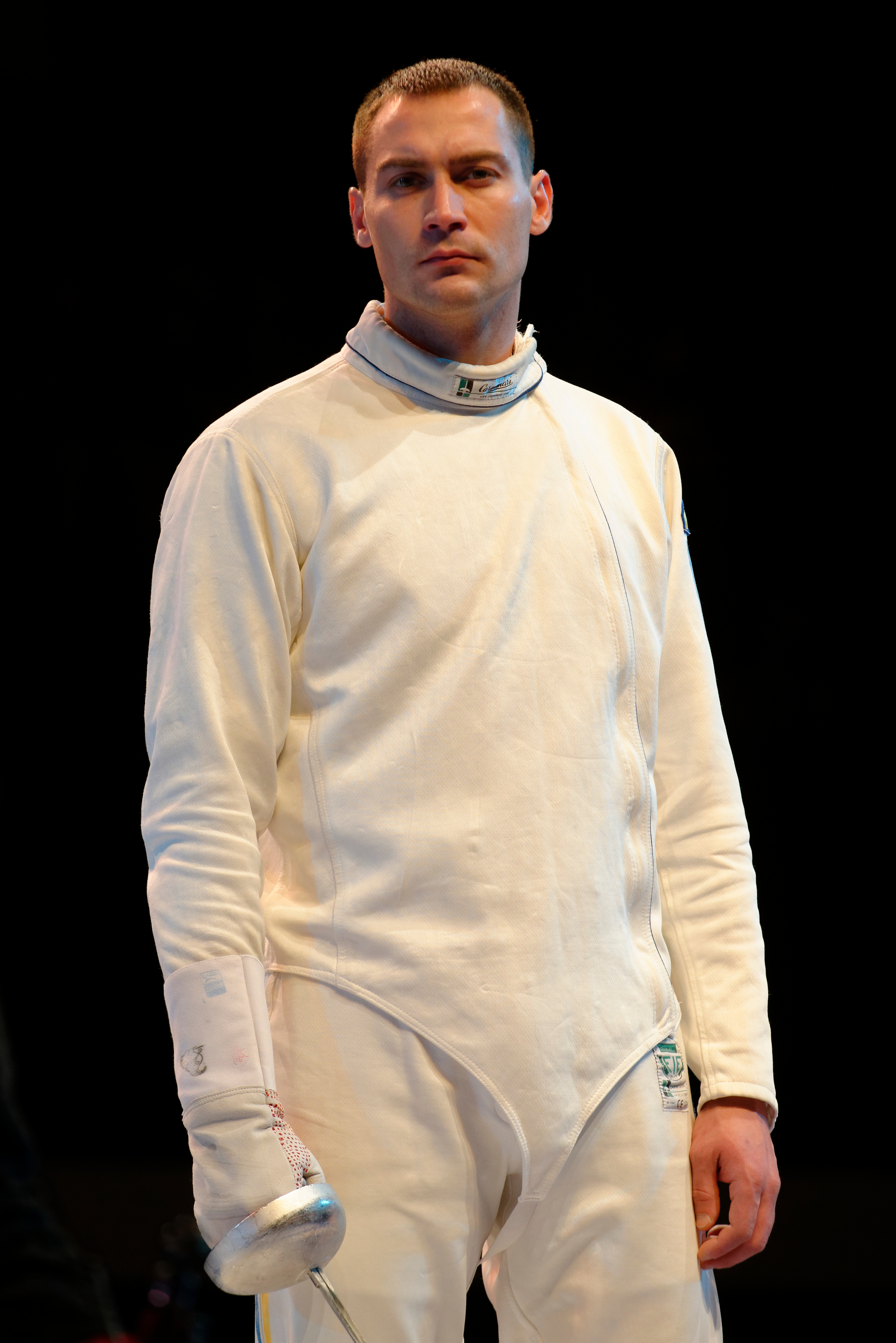
- Masters à l'épée 2013

Personal information
- Full name: Bohdan Serhiyovych Nikishyn
- Born: 29 May 1980 (age 46) Dnipropetrovsk, Ukrainian SSR, Soviet Union
- Height: 1.88 m (6 ft 2 in)
- Weight: 85 kg (187 lb)

Fencing career
- Sport: Fencing
- Country: Ukraine
- Weapon: Épée
- Hand: right-handed
- National coach: Volodymyr Stankevych
- Head coach: Olga Markina, Serhiy Komarov
- FIE ranking: current ranking
Medal record
World Championships
Gold medal – first place	2015 Moscow	Team
Silver medal – second place	2013 Budapest	Team
Silver medal – second place	2019 Budapest	Team
Bronze medal – third place	2006 Turin	Team
Bronze medal – third place	2018 Wuxi	Individual
European Championships
Silver medal – second place	2010 Leipzig	Team
Silver medal – second place	2017 Tbilisi	Team
Bronze medal – third place	2012 Legnano	Team
Bronze medal – third place	2013 Zagreb	Team
Bronze medal – third place	2016 Torun	Team
Bronze medal – third place	2016 Torun	Individual
Bronze medal – third place	2018 Novi Sad	Individual
Summer Universiade
Gold medal – first place	2003 Daegu	Team

Bohdan Serhiyovych Nikishyn (Ukrainian: Богдан Сергійович Нікішин, romanized: Bohdan Serhiyovyč Nikišyn; born 29 May 1980) is a Ukrainian right-handed épée fencer, 2015 team world champion, and three-time Olympian.

Nikishyn competed in the 2004 Athens Olympic Games, the 2008 Beijing Olympic Games, and the 2016 Rio de Janeiro Olympic Games.

Nikishyn won a bronze medal in the team men's épée event at the 2006 World Fencing Championships in Turin, Italy, a silver medal in the team men's épée event at the 2013 World Fencing Championships in Budapest, Hungary, a gold medal in the team men's épée event at the 2015 World Fencing Championships in Moscow, Russia, a bronze medal in the individual men's épée event at the 2018 World Fencing Championships in Wuxi, China, and a silver medal in the team men's épée event at the 2019 World Fencing Championships in Budapest, Hungary.

Nikishyn won a bronze medal in the individual men's épée event at the 2016 European Fencing Championships in Toruń, Poland, and a bronze medal in the individual men's épée event at the 2018 European Fencing Championships in Novi Sad, Serbia.

Between 2006 and 2019, Nikishyn won two FIE Men's Épée Grand Prix titles, in addition to two silver medals and four bronze medals.

Between 2008 and 2020, Nikishyn won four FIE Men's Épée World Cup titles, in addition to four silver medals and three bronze medals.

== Career ==
Nikishyn took up fencing at the age of ten after he came by chance to a fencing training. He won a team silver medal at the 1998 Junior World Championships in Keszthely and joined the senior national team for the 2001 World Championships in Nîmes. He took part in the 2004 Summer Olympics, but was eliminated in the preliminary round by Romania's Alexandru Nyisztor. In the team event Ukraine was defeated in the first round by Hungary and finished 5th after the placement rounds.

Nikishyn was excluded from the national team in the 2004–05 season, but he was reinstated the next season. He achieved his first World Cup podium with a bronze medal in the Doha Grand Prix. At the 2006 World Championships in Turin he was eliminated in the qualifications phase of the individual event. In the team event Nikishyn, Dmytro Karyuchenko, Maksym Khvorost and Dmytro Chumak were defeated in the semi-finals, then overcame Hungary to earn Ukraine's first world medal in team épée.

At his second Olympics, Beijing 2008, Nikishyn was stopped in the second round by Switzerland's Michael Kauter. In the team event Ukraine was defeated in the first round by Poland and finished 7th.

At the 2013 World Championships in Budapest Nikishyn lost in the first round to Spain's José Luis Abajo. In the team event Ukraine defeated Russia in the round of 16. After that they defeated the Czech Republic and France to meet Hungary in the final. Hungary won scoring 42–38 and Ukraine took a silver medal, the best result in Ukrainian history for men's team épée.

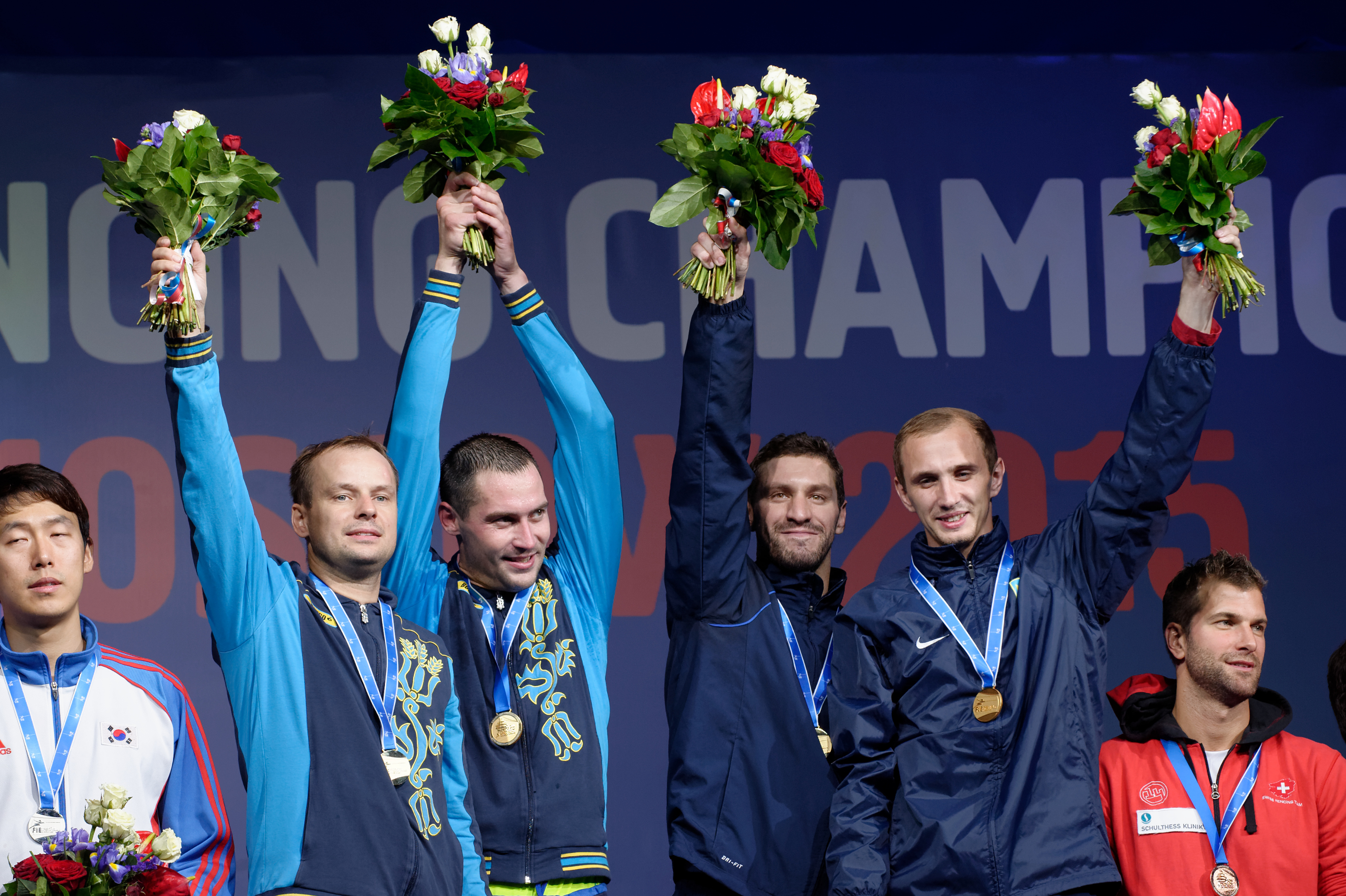
Nikishyn (2nd to left) and teammates celebrate their gold medal in the 2015 World Fencing Championships

In the 2012–13 season Nikishyn won the Heidenheim Grand Prix and earned a silver medal in the Berne Grand Prix, which allowed him to enter the Top 10 for the first time in his career. In the next season he reached the final in the Doha Grand Prix, where he was defeated by Korea's Park Sang-young, but then he won the Heidenheim Grand Prix and the Buenos Aires Grand Prix. He made his way to the quarter-finals of the 2014 World Championships in Kazan, where he lost to Korea's Park Kyoung-doo. He finished the season as No.2 in world rankings.

The 2014–15 season was more difficult with only a quarter-finals finish at the Heidenheimer Pokal. At the European Championships in Montreux he lost in the round of 16 to France's Ronan Gustin. The Ukrainian team lost to world No.1 France in the semifinals, then to hosts Switzerland and finished fourth. At the World Championships in Moscow, Nikishyn was eliminated again in the round of 16, losing to the eventual world champion Géza Imre. In the team event, Ukraine defeated Cuba, then Spain. They had a tight 34–33 victory over hosts Russia in the quarter-finals, then prevailed in the semi-final against Italy after a semi-final was marked by several non-combativity calls, which finished on the low score of 15–11. Passivity was also used on both sides in the final against South Korea. Nikishyn entered the match last when the score was 11–7 and, defending against Jung Seung-hwa's attacks, finished on 34–24, allowing Ukraine to win their first world title in men's fencing.

In 2016 he won the bronze medal at the European Championships in the team and in the individual championships. In personal Bogdan defeated such rivals as: Bartosz Pisetsky (15:6), Gabor Boczko (10:9), Paolo Pizzo (15:6) and Géza Imre (15:11). Nikishin lost in the semifinals to the future winner - Yannick Borel (8:15).

== Medal Record ==
=== World Championship ===
Year	Location	Event	Position
2006	Turin, Italy	Team Men's Épée	3rd
2013	Budapest, Hungary	Team Men's Épée	2nd
2015	Moscow, Russia	Team Men's Épée	1st
2018	Wuxi, China	Individual Men's Épée	3rd
2019	Budapest, Hungary	Team Men's Épée	2nd

=== European Championship ===
Year	Location	Event	Position
2010	Leipzig, Germany	Team Men's Épée	2nd
2012	Legnano, Italy	Team Men's Épée	3rd
2016	Toruń, Poland	Individual Men's Épée	3rd
2016	Toruń, Poland	Team Men's Épée	3rd
2017	Leipzig, Germany	Team Men's Épée	2nd
2018	Novi Sad, Serbia	Individual Men's Épée	3rd

=== Grand Prix ===
Date	Location	Event	Position
02/10/2006	Doha, Qatar	Individual Men's Épée	3rd
03/05/2010	Stockholm, Sweden	Individual Men's Épée	3rd
06/02/2012	Bern, Switzerland	Individual Men's Épée	2nd
05/11/2013	Bern, Switzerland	Individual Men's Épée	2nd
01/16/2014	Doha, Qatar	Individual Men's Épée	3rd
04/22/2016	Rio de Janeiro, Brazil	Individual Men's Épée	1st
05/26/2017	Bogotá, Colombia	Individual Men's Épée	1st
01/25/2019	Doha, Qatar	Individual Men's Épée	3rd

=== World Cup ===
Date	Location	Event	Position
06/06/2008	Caguas, Puerto Rico	Individual Men's Épée	3rd
02/15/2013	Heidenheim, Germany	Individual Men's Épée	1st
02/14/2014	Heidenheim, Germany	Individual Men's Épée	1st
05/23/2014	Buenos Aires, Argentina	Individual Men's Épée	1st
01/21/2016	Heidenheim, Germany	Individual Men's Épée	2nd
10/28/2016	Bern, Switzerland	Individual Men's Épée	3rd
10/27/2017	Bern, Switzerland	Individual Men's Épée	2nd
01/25/2018	Heidenheim, Germany	Individual Men's Épée	2nd
02/16/2018	Vancouver, Canada	Individual Men's Épée	1st
05/11/2018	Paris, France	Individual Men's Épée	2nd
02/07/2020	Vancouver, Canada	Individual Men's Épée	3rd

== Personal life ==
Nikishyn was educated at the Prydniprovska State Academy of Civil Engineering and Architecture in Dnipropetrovsk. He is married and has two children: Anastasia and Maksym.

Olympic Games
Preceded by Mykola Milchev	Flagbearer for Ukraine (with Olena Kostevych); Tokyo 2020	Succeeded by Incumbent
