= Jung Jin-sun =

South Korean fencer (born 1984)

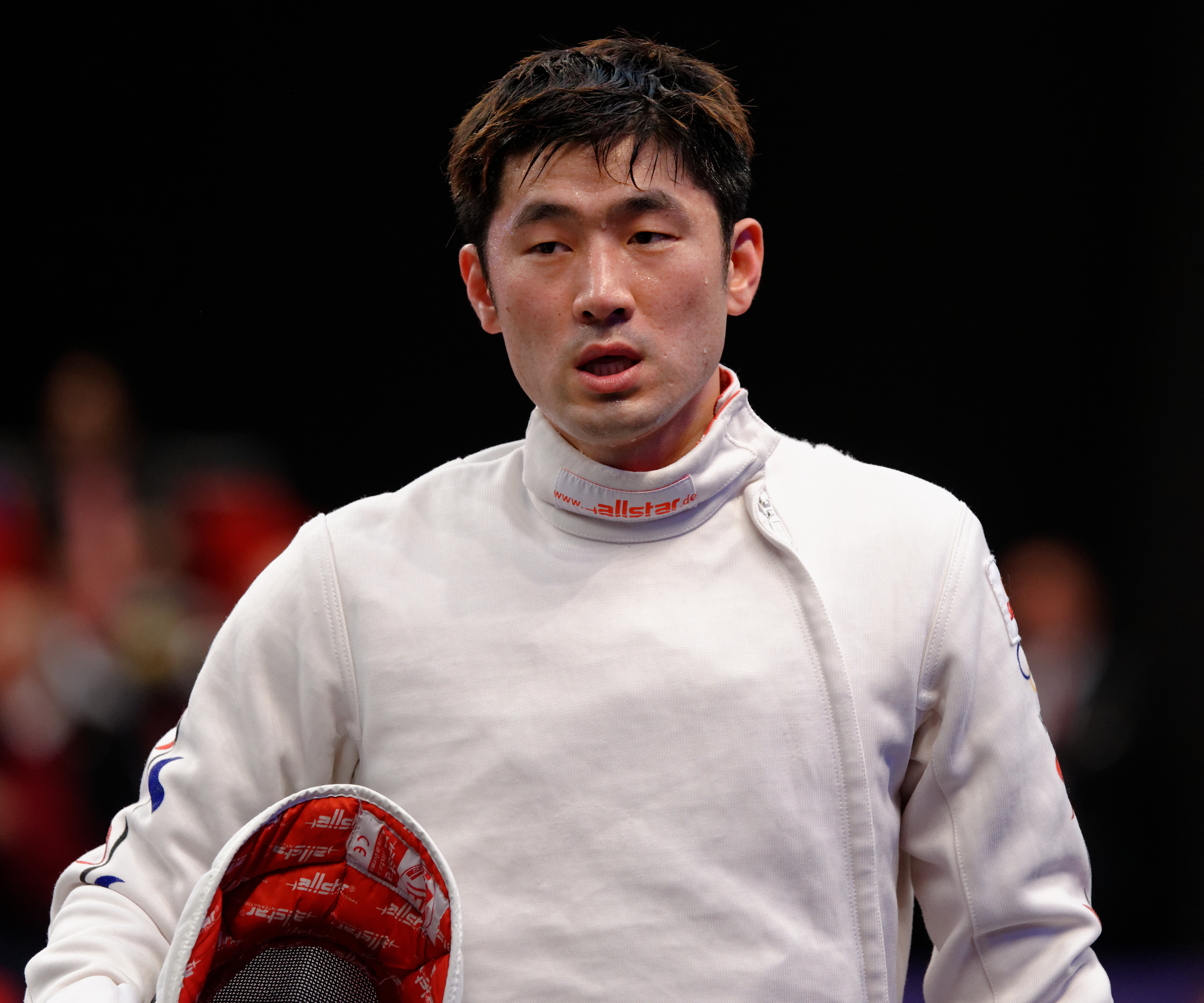
- At the 2014 Paris World Cup

Personal information
- Nationality: South Korean
- Born: 24 January 1984 (age 42) Hwaseong, Gyeonggi Province, South Korea
- Height: 1.85 m (6 ft 1 in)
- Weight: 78 kg (172 lb)

Fencing career
- Sport: Fencing
- Country: South Korea
- Weapon: Épée
- Hand: right-handed
- Club: Hwaseong City Hall
- FIE ranking: current ranking
Medal record
Olympic Games
Bronze medal – third place	2012 London	Individual épée
World Championships
Silver medal – second place	2014 Kazan	Team épée
Silver medal – second place	2018 Wuxi	Team épée
Asian Games
Gold medal – first place	2006 Doha	Team épée
Gold medal – first place	2010 Guangzhou	Team épée
Gold medal – first place	2014 Incheon	Individual épée
Gold medal – first place	2014 Incheon	Team épée
Bronze medal – third place	2018 Jakarta	Individual épée
Asian Fencing Championships
Gold medal – first place	2011 Seoul	Individual épée
Gold medal – first place	2012 Wakayama	Individual épée
Gold medal – first place	2014 Suwon	Individual épée

Jung Jin-Sun (Korean: 정진선; Hanja: 鄭鎭善; Korean pronunciation: [tɕʌŋ.dʑin.sʌn] or [tɕʌŋ] [tɕin.sʌn]; born 24 January 1984) is a South Korean right-handed épée fencer, four-time team Asian champion, four-time individual Asian champion, three-time Olympian, and 2012 individual Olympic bronze medalist.

== Career ==
Jung took up fencing in middle school after being noticed by Olympian Yang Dal-sik.

He made his international debut in the 2004–05 season and won a bronze medal in the Stockholm Grand Prix. A year later, he won gold in team épée at the 2006 Asian Games in Doha. He then went through a dry spell until he reached the final in the 2008 at the Koweit City World Cup. He climbed on the podium in Montréal and Cali and won the Puerto Rico Grand Prix. In the 2008 Beijing Olympics. He was one of the top seeds for the individual épée competition, but lost 15–11 in the quarter-finals to eventual silver medalist Fabrice Jeannet of France. These results allowed him to finish the season at the second place in world rankings.

In 2011 Jung won the gold medal in the Asian Championships at home in Seoul, a feat he repeated a year later at Wakayama. In the 2012 London Olympics, he knocked out world No.4 Elmir Alimzhanov, then Jörg Fiedler, but was defeated after a tight bout against surprise semifinalist Bartosz Piasecki of Norway. He then met American fencer Weston Kelsey in the bronze medal match. They were tied at 11 all at the end of fencing time. After two double hits, Jung scored with a foot touch to come away with a bronze medal.

After the 2012 Games, Jung won a bronze medal in the 2013 Legnano World Cup. He won the gold medal in the same event a year later, along with a bronze in the Paris World Cup. He won the 2014 Asian Fencing Championships in Suwon after defeating Japan's Keisuke Sakamoto in the final. In the World Championships in Kazan, he made it to the round of 16 but was stopped by Italy's Enrico Garozzo, who eventually won the bronze medal. In the team event, No.6 seed South Korea defeated Brazil, Japan, Ukraine, then host Russia to meet France in the final. After a good start Korea could not prevent a French comeback. They were defeated 39–45 and came away with the silver medal.

== Medal record ==
=== Olympic Games ===
Year	Location	Event	Position
2012	London, United Kingdom	Individual Men's Épée	3rd

=== World Championship ===
Year	Location	Event	Position
2014	Kazan, Russia	Team Men's Épée	2nd
2018	Wuxi, China	Team Men's Épée	2nd

=== Asian Championship ===
Year	Location	Event	Position
2007	Nantong, China	Team Men's Épée	3rd
2008	Bangkok, Thailand	Team Men's Épée	1st
2011	Seoul, South Korea	Individual Men's Épée	1st
2011	Seoul, South Korea	Team Men's Épée	1st
2012	Wakayama, Japan	Individual Men's Épée	1st
2014	Suwon, South Korea	Individual Men's Épée	1st
2014	Suwon, South Korea	Team Men's Épée	1st
2016	Wuxi, China	Team Men's Épée	2nd
2017	Hong Kong, China	Individual Men's Épée	3rd
2017	Hong Kong, China	Team Men's Épée	1st
2018	Bangkok, Thailand	Individual Men's Épée	1st

=== Grand Prix ===
Date	Location	Event	Position
03/11/2005	Stockholm, Sweden	Individual Men's Épée	3rd
01/25/2008	Kuwait City, Kuwait	Individual Men's Épée	2nd
05/30/2008	Montreal, Canada	Individual Men's Épée	3rd
03/24/2017	Budapest, Hungary	Individual Men's Épée	1st
12/08/2017	Doha, Qatar	Individual Men's Épée	2nd

=== World Cup ===
Date	Location	Event	Position
03/01/2008	Bern, Switzerland	Individual Men's Épée	3rd
06/06/2008	Caguas, Puerto Rico	Individual Men's Épée	1st
06/14/2008	Cali, Colombia	Individual Men's Épée	3rd
01/25/2013	Legnano, Italy	Individual Men's Épée	3rd
01/24/2014	Legnano, Italy	Individual Men's Épée	1st
05/02/2014	Paris, France	Individual Men's Épée	3rd
02/13/2015	Vancouver, Canada	Individual Men's Épée	3rd
