= Dmytro Chumak (fencer) =

Ukrainian fencer (born 1980)

Personal information
- Native name: Дмитро Олександрович Чумак
- Full name: Dmytro Oleksandrovych Chumak
- Born: 1 April 1980 (age 46)
- Height: 1.95 m (6 ft 5 in)
- Weight: 88 kg (194 lb)

Fencing career
- Sport: Fencing
- Weapon: Épée
- Hand: Left-handed
- Club: Dynamo Kyiv
- Retired: 2009
- FIE ranking: ranking (archive)
Medal record
Men's épée fencing
Representing Ukraine
World Championships
Bronze medal – third place	2005 Leipzig	Team épée
Bronze medal – third place	2006 Turin	Team épée
European Championships
Gold medal – first place	2001 Koblenz	Team épée
Silver medal – second place	2003 Bourges	Team épée
Bronze medal – third place	2005 Zalaegerszeg	Individual épée
Summer Universiade
Gold medal – first place	2005 Izmir	Team épée
Bronze medal – third place	2005 Izmir	Individual épée

Dmytro Oleksandrovych Chumak (Ukrainian: Дмитро Олександрович Чумак; born 29 January 1980) is a Ukrainian épée fencer.

== Career ==
Chumak won a bronze medal at the 2005 European Championships in Zalaegerszeg after being defeated 13–15 in the semi-finals by Poland's Tomasz Motyka. Along with Dmytro Karyuchenko, Maksym Khvorost and Bohdan Nikishyn, he earned the bronze medal in the épée team event of the 2006 World Fencing Championships after beating Hungary in the bronze medal match.

Chumak competed at the 2008 Beijing Olympics. In the first round he defeated Venezuela's Rubén Limardo, who would become Olympic champion at the 2012 London Olympics, but was stopped in the table of 16 by South Korea's Jung Jin-sun. In the team event, Ukraine lost in the quarter-finals to Poland and finished 7th after the qualification rounds.

Chumak also coaches at the Academy of Fencing Masters in Campbell, California.
