= Dario Torrente =

South African fencer

Personal information
- Born: 1 May 1966 (age 60)

Sport
- Sport: Fencing

Dario Torrente (born 1 May 1966) is a South African épée, foil and sabre fencer. He competed at the 1992 and 2008 Summer Olympics.
