= Yin Lianchi =

Chinese épée fencer

Yin Lianchi (born January 12, 1984) in Guangzhou, Guangdong) is a Chinese épée fencer, who competed at the 2008 Summer Olympics and performed his personal best with the 4th épée team.

== Major performances ==
- 2003 National Intercity Games - 1st épée individual

== See also ==
- China at the 2008 Summer Olympics
