= Fabrice Jeannet =

French fencer (born 1980)

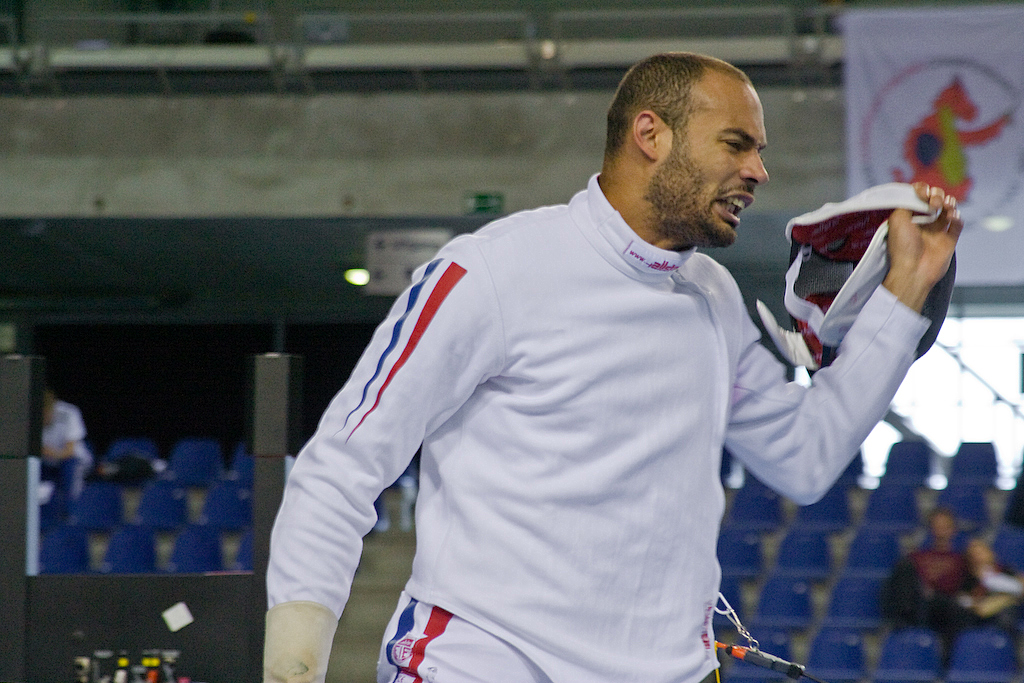
- Fabrice Jeannet at the 2007 European Championships

Personal information
- Born: October 20, 1980 (age 45) Fort-de-France, Martinique
- Height: 6 ft 3.5 in (192 cm)
- Weight: 187 lb (85 kg)

Fencing career
- Sport: Fencing
- Country: France
- Weapon: Épée
- Hand: Right
- Years on national team: 2001-2008
- Retired: 2008
- Highest ranking: 1
- FIE ranking: Current ranking
Medal record
Men's fencing
Representing France
Olympic Games
Gold medal – first place	2004 Athens	Team épée
Gold medal – first place	2008 Beijing	Team épée
Silver medal – second place	2008 Beijing	Epée
World Championships
Gold medal – first place	2002 Lisbon	Team épée
Gold medal – first place	2003 Havana	Epée
Gold medal – first place	2005 Leipzig	Team épée
Gold medal – first place	2006 Turin	Team épée
Gold medal – first place	2007 Saint Petersburg	Team épée
Silver medal – second place	2002 Lisbon	Epée
Silver medal – second place	2005 Leipzig	Epée
Bronze medal – third place	2001 Nîmes	Team épée
Bronze medal – third place	2001 Nîmes	Epée

Fabrice Jeannet (born 20 October 1980 in Fort-de-France, Martinique) is a retired French épée fencer.

Jeannet won the gold medal in the épée team event at the 2004 and 2008 Summer Olympics and a silver medal in the individual épée in 2008. He was also a member of the French team that won the 2006 World Fencing Championships after beating Spain in the final. He accomplished this with his teammates Ulrich Robeiri, Gauthier Grumier and Érik Boisse.

His brother, Jérôme Jeannet is a fencer too.
