= Radosław Zawrotniak =

Polish fencer (born 1981)

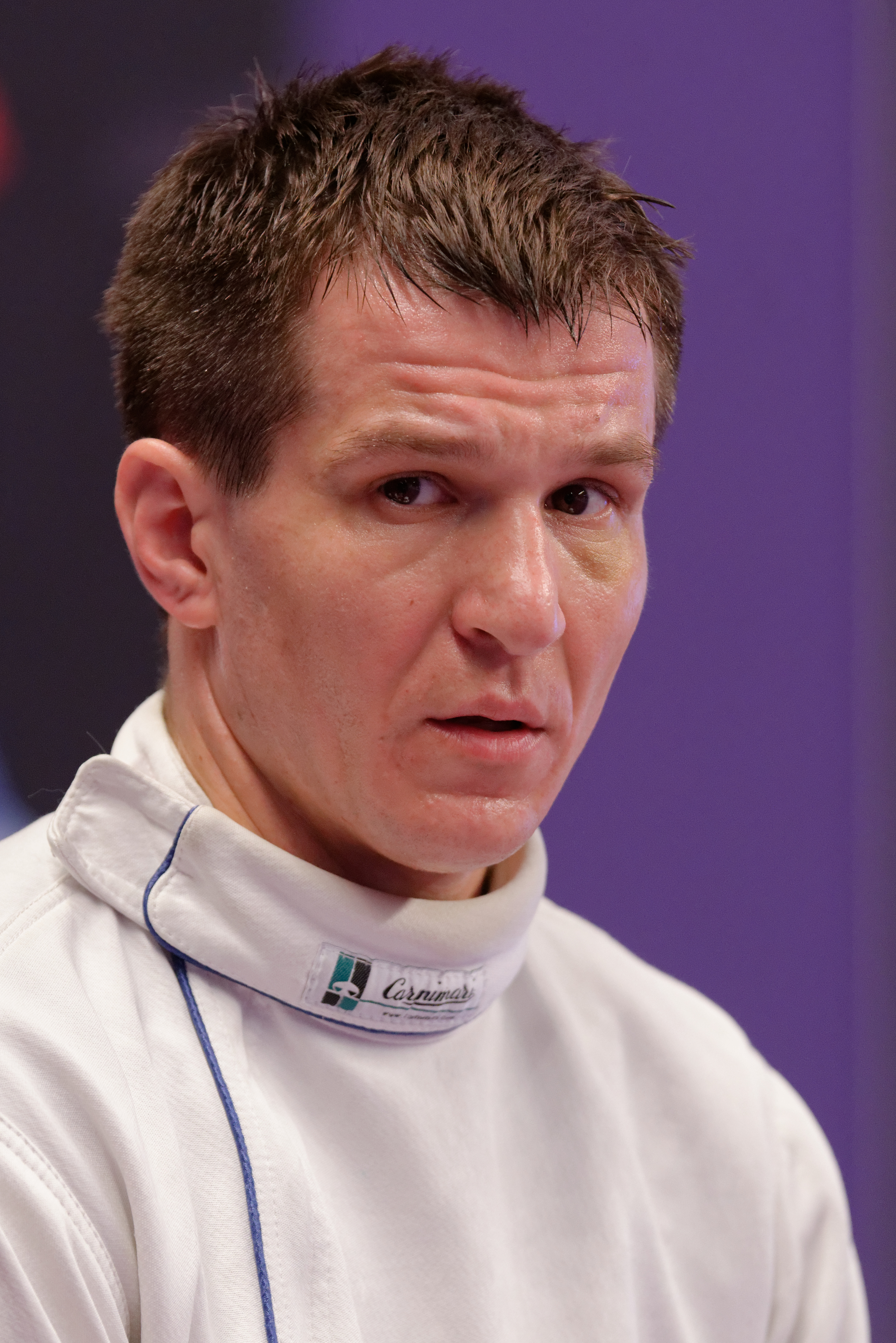

Personal information
- Born: 2 September 1981 (age 44) Kraków, Poland
- Height: 1.81 m (5 ft 11 in)
- Weight: 75 kg (165 lb)

Fencing career
- Sport: Fencing
- Weapon: épée
- Hand: left-handed
- Club: AZS AWF Kraków
- FIE ranking: current ranking
Medal record
Men's épée
Representing Poland
Event	1st	2nd	3rd
Olympic Games	0	1	0
World Championships	0	0	1
European Championships	0	1	1
Total	0	2	2
Olympic Games
Silver medal – second place	2008 Beijing	Team
World Championships
Bronze medal – third place	2009 Antalya	Team
European Championships
Silver medal – second place	2007 Gand	Team
Bronze medal – third place	2010 Leipzig	Individual

Radosław Aleksander Zawrotniak (born 2 September 1981 in Kraków, Małopolskie) is a Polish fencer who won a silver medal in Men's Team Épée (Fencing) at the 2008 Summer Olympics in Beijing, together with Tomasz Motyka, Adam Wiercioch, and Robert Andrzejuk.

For his sport achievements, he received:
Golden Cross of Merit in 2008.

== Record Against Selected Opponents ==
Includes results from all competitions 2006–present and major competitions from pre - 2006. The list includes athletes who have reached the quarterfinals at the World Championships or Olympic Games, plus those who have earned medals in major team competitions.

- (Portugal) Joaquim Videira 1–2
- (Ukraine) Dmitriy Karuchenko 1–0
- (France) Érik Boisse 0-1
