= Alfredo Rota =

Italian fencer (born 1975)

Personal information
- Born: 21 July 1975 (age 50) Milan, Italy

Sport
- Sport: Fencing
Medal record
Men's fencing
Representing Italy
Olympic Games
Gold medal – first place	2000 Sydney	Team épée
Bronze medal – third place	2008 Beijing	Team épée

Alfredo Rota (born 21 July 1975) is an Italian fencer. He won the bronze medal in the men's team épée event at the 2008 Summer Olympics. He also won the Olympic gold medal in Men's Team Épée at the 2000 Sydney Olympics.
