= Ulrich Robeiri =

French fencer (born 1982)

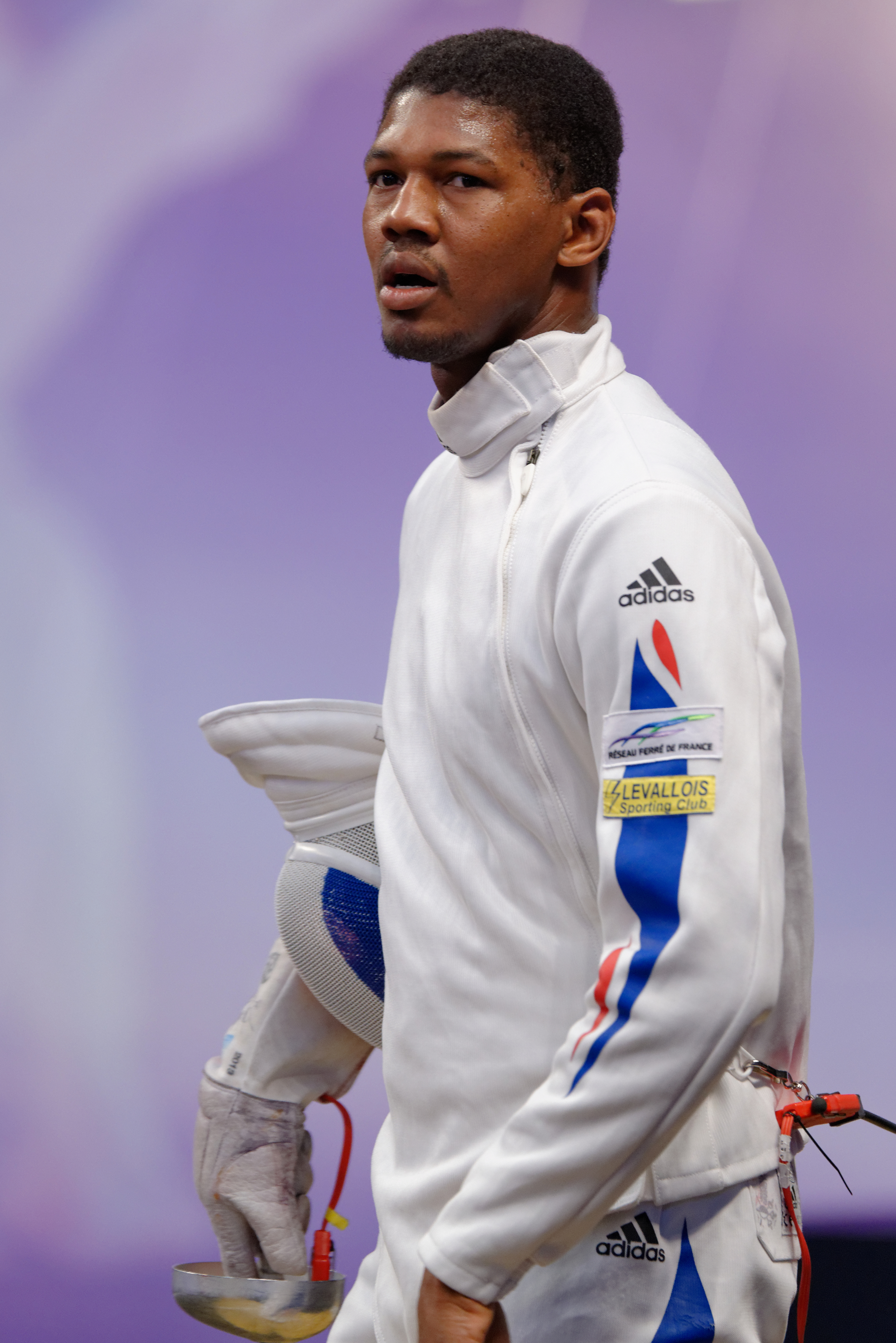
- At the 2014 Challenge International de Paris

Personal information
- Born: 26 October 1982 (age 43) Cayenne, French Guiana
- Height: 1.91 m (6 ft 3 in)
- Weight: 85 kg (187 lb; 13.4 st)

Fencing career
- Sport: Fencing
- Weapon: épée
- Hand: Right-handed
- National coach: Hugues Obry
- Club: Levallois Sporting Club
- FIE ranking: current ranking
Medal record
Men's fencing
Representing France
Olympic Games
Gold medal – first place	2008 Beijing	Team épée
World Championships
Gold medal – first place	2005 Leipzig	Team épée
Gold medal – first place	2006 Turin	Team épée
Gold medal – first place	2007 Saint-Petersburg	Team épée
Gold medal – first place	2009 Antalya	Team épée
Gold medal – first place	2010 Paris	Team épée
Gold medal – first place	2014 Kazan	Individual
Gold medal – first place	2014 Kazan	Team épée
Silver medal – second place	2012 Kyiv	Team épée
Bronze medal – third place	2003 Havana	Individual
Bronze medal – third place	2013 Budapest	Team épée
European Championships
Gold medal – first place	2008 Kyiv	Team épée
Silver medal – second place	2009 Plovdiv	Individual
Bronze medal – third place	2007 Ghent	Team épée
Bronze medal – third place	2013 Zagreb	Individual

Ulrich Robeiri (born 26 October 1982) is a French right-handed épée fencer, two-time team European champion, six-time team world champion, 2014 individual world champion, and 2008 team Olympic champion.

== Career ==
Robeiri was born in Cayenne, French Guiana. He began fencing at age 8 at the Éclaireuses et Éclaireurs de France, an interreligious scouting association. He first practiced foil, the traditional learning weapon, before turning to épée. He first joined the centre for promising young athletes in Les Abymes, in Guadeloupe, then at the age of 15, the centre of Reims in metropolitan France. In 2001, he earned a bronze medal in the Junior European Championships in Keszthely. A year later, he was admitted into INSEP, a state institution for high-performance athletes. That same year, he earned the gold medal both in the individual and team event of the Junior World Championships in Antalya.

During his first season as a senior, he won the Lisbon Grand Prix and the Paris World Cup, and earned a bronze medal in the World Championships in Havana. He finished the season No.4 in world rankings. After a dry spell in 2003–04, he won the Heidenheim Grand Prix and the Puerto Rico World Cup in 2005. The same year, he joined the French national épée team, which had won the Olympic gold at Athens. With Érik Boisse, Jérôme Jeannet and Fabrice Jeannet, Robeiri won the gold medal at the World Championships. The team would come to be known as “the Invincibles”, as they dominated men's épée from 2004 to 2010 with eight consecutive world titles.

In the 2013–14 season, Robeiri placed second in the Berne Grand Prix and made it to the quarter-finals in the European Championships in Strasbourg before being defeated by Hungary's András Rédli, who eventually won the competition. A month after, Robeiri made it to the semi-final where he defeated his old teammate Gauthier Grumier. In the final, he prevailed over Park Kyoung-doo of South Korea to win his first individual World title.

Robeiri graduated from the Polytech'Paris-UPMC engineering school. He works as an engineer within the information and communications systems division of RATP Group, the public transport operator for Paris, with a special contract which allows him to train and to attend major competitions.

== Medal Record ==
=== Olympic Games ===
Year	Location	Event	Position
2008	Beijing, China	Team Men's Épée	1st

=== World Championship ===
Year	Location	Event	Position
2003	Havana, Cuba	Individual Men's Épée	3rd
2005	Leipzig, Germany	Team Men's Épée	1st
2006	Turin, Italy	Team Men's Épée	1st
2007	St. Petersburg, Russia	Team Men's Épée	1st
2009	Antalya, Turkey	Team Men's Épée	1st
2010	Paris, France	Team Men's Épée	1st
2012	Kyiv, Ukraine	Team Men's Épée	2nd
2013	Budapest, Hungary	Team Men's Épée	3rd
2014	Kazan, Russia	Individual Men's Épée	1st
2014	Kazan, Russia	Team Men's Épée	1st

=== European Championship ===
Year	Location	Event	Position
2007	Ghent, Belgium	Team Men's Épée	3rd
2008	Kyiv, Ukraine	Team Men's Épée	1st
2009	Plovdiv, Bulgaria	Individual Men's Épée	2nd
2013	Zagreb, Croatia	Individual Men's Épée	3rd
2015	Montreux, Switzerland	Team Men's Épée	1st

=== Grand Prix ===
Date	Location	Event	Position
2003-02-01	Lisbon, Portugal	Individual Men's Épée	1st
2003-03-21	Montreal, Canada	Individual Men's Épée	3rd
2005-04-29	Heidenheim, Germany	Individual Men's Épée	1st
2006-01-27	Kuwait City, Kuwait	Individual Men's Épée	2nd
2008-02-01	Legnano, Italy	Individual Men's Épée	1st
2010-01-29	Legnano, Italy	Individual Men's Épée	1st
2012-05-12	Stockholm, Sweden	Individual Men's Épée	3rd
2014-05-10	Bern, Switzerland	Individual Men's Épée	2nd

=== World Cup ===
Date	Location	Event	Position
2003-03-15	Paris, France	Individual Men's Épée	1st
2005-07-02	Carolina, Puerto Rico	Individual Men's Épée	1st
2006-05-20	Tallinn, Estonia	Individual Men's Épée	1st
2007-02-17	Tallinn, Estonia	Individual Men's Épée	1st
2007-03-23	Heidenheim, Germany	Individual Men's Épée	2nd
2007-06-08	Caguas, Puerto Rico	Individual Men's Épée	1st
2009-05-09	Paris, France	Individual Men's Épée	3rd
2011-06-17	Buenos Aires, Argentina	Individual Men's Épée	3rd
2012-01-27	Legnano, Italy	Individual Men's Épée	2nd
2012-04-27	Heidenheim, Germany	Individual Men's Épée	1st
2013-02-15	Heidenheim, Germany	Individual Men's Épée	2nd
2014-10-24	Bern, Switzerland	Individual Men's Épée	3rd
