= Géza Imre =

Hungarian fencer (born 1974)

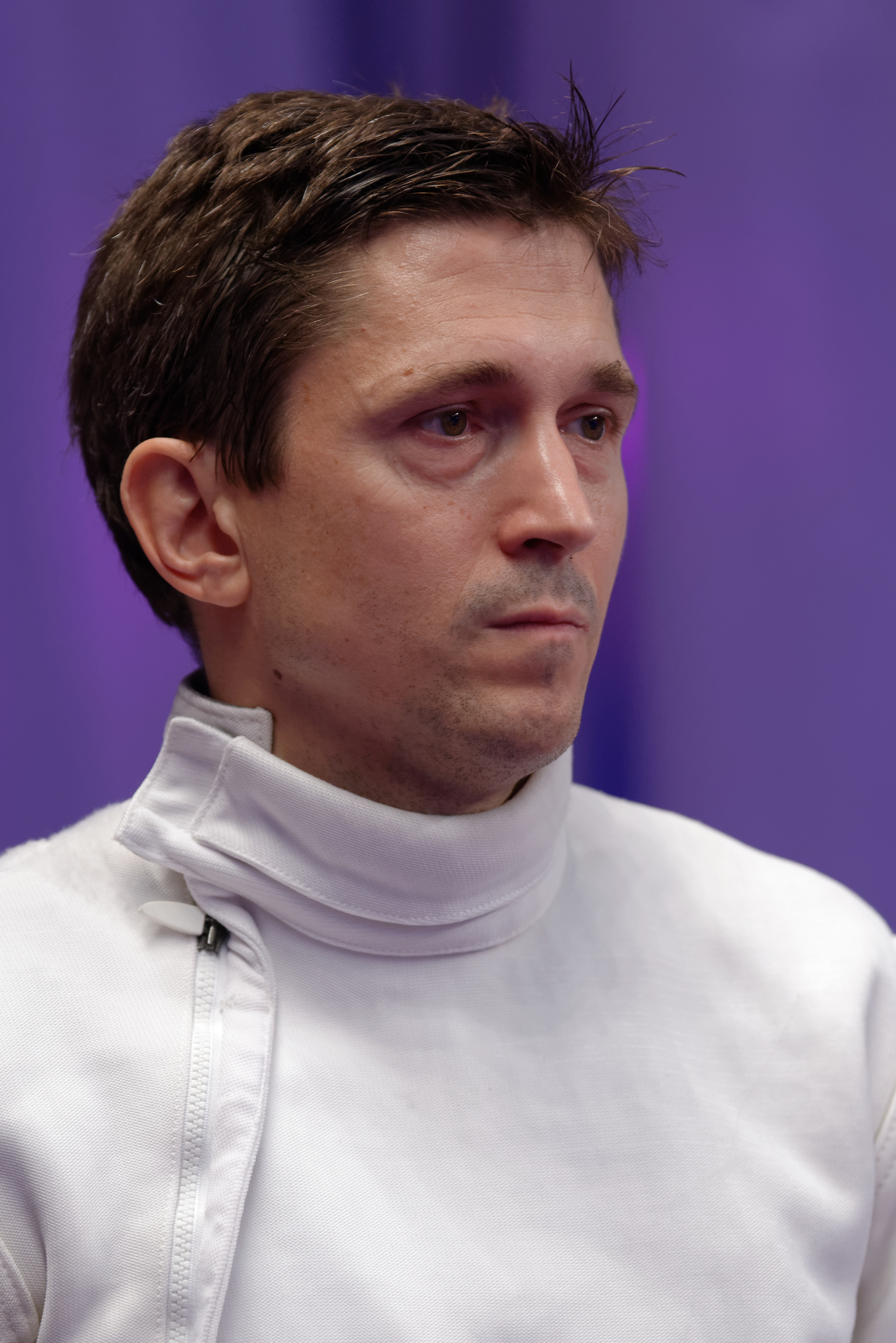
- Imre at the 2016 Paris World Cup

Personal information
- Nationality: Hungarian
- Born: 23 December 1974 (age 51) Budapest, Hungary
- Height: 1.84 m (6 ft 0 in)
- Weight: 73 kg (161 lb)

Fencing career
- Sport: Fencing
- Weapon: épée
- Hand: left-handed
- Club: Újpest (–1993); Budapest SE (1993–1996); Bp. Honvéd (1996–2017)
- FIE ranking: current ranking
Medal record
Men's fencing
Representing Hungary
Event	1st	2nd	3rd
Olympic Games	0	2	2
World Championships	4	2	4
European Championships	6	4	2
Total	10	8	8
Olympic Games
Silver medal – second place	2004 Athens	Team
Silver medal – second place	2016 Rio de Janeiro	Individual
Bronze medal – third place	1996 Atlanta	Individual
Bronze medal – third place	2016 Rio de Janeiro	Team
World Championships
Gold medal – first place	1998 La Chaux-de-Fonds	Team
Gold medal – first place	2001 Nîmes	Team
Gold medal – first place	2013 Budapest	Team
Gold medal – first place	2015 Moscow	Individual
Silver medal – second place	2009 Antalya	Team
Silver medal – second place	2011 Catania	Team
Bronze medal – third place	1995 The Hague	Team
Bronze medal – third place	2007 Sankt-Peterburg	Team
Bronze medal – third place	2010 Paris	Team
Bronze medal – third place	2012 Kyiv	Team
European Championships
Gold medal – first place	1998 Plovdiv	Team
Gold medal – first place	2006 İzmir	Team
Gold medal – first place	2007 Gent	Team
Gold medal – first place	2008 Kyiv	Individual
Gold medal – first place	2009 Plovdiv	Team
Gold medal – first place	2010 Leipzig	Team
Silver medal – second place	2008 Kyiv	Team
Silver medal – second place	2011 Sheffield	Team
Silver medal – second place	2012 Legnano	Team
Silver medal – second place	2013 Zagreb	Team
Bronze medal – third place	2002 Moscow	Individual
Bronze medal – third place	2005 Zalaegerszeg	Team

Géza Imre (pronounced [ˈɡeːzɒ ˈimrɛ]; born 23 December 1974) is a Hungarian fencer, who has won four Olympic medals in the Épée competitions, a silver medal in 2004 Summer Olympics in Athens, a bronze medal in 1996 Summer Olympics in Atlanta and both a bronze and a silver medal in 2016 Summer Olympics in Rio de Janeiro. He was the 2015 world champion in men's épée in Moscow.

He is the husband of Beatrix Kökény, a Hungarian handballer.

== Awards ==
- Hungarian Fencer of the Year (2): 1996, 2015
- Member of the Hungarian team of year: 1998
- National Defence awards, II.class (1998)
- Budapest Pro Urbe award (2016)

Orders and special awards

- Cross of Merit of the Republic of Hungary – Silver Cross (1996)
- Order of Merit of the Republic of Hungary – Knight's Cross (2004)
- Order of Merit of Hungary – Commander's Cross (2016)
