= Men's épée at the 2017 World Fencing Championships =

- Venue: Arena Leipzig
- Location: Leipzig, Germany
- Dates: 22 July

Medalists
gold medal	Paolo Pizzo	Italy
silver medal	Nikolai Novosjolov	Estonia
bronze medal	Richard Schmidt	Germany
bronze medal	András Rédli	Hungary

The Men's épée event of the 2017 World Fencing Championships was held on 22 July 2017. The qualification was held on 19 July 2017.

== Draw ==
=== Finals ===
Semi-finals
(Germany) Richard Schmidt	10
(Italy) Paolo Pizzo	15
(Estonia) Nikolai Novosjolov	15
(Hungary) András Rédli	10

Final
(Italy) Paolo Pizzo	15
(Estonia) Nikolai Novosjolov	13

=== Top half ===
==== Section 1 ====
Round of 64
1	(South Korea) Park Sang-young	12
64	(Luxembourg) Flavio Giannotte	15
33	(Ukraine) Maksym Khvorost	5
32	(Germany) Richard Schmidt	15
17	(Kazakhstan) Ruslan Kurbanov	15
48	(Hong Kong) Fong Hoi-sun	12
49	(Czech Republic) Jiří Beran	15
16	(Russia) Vadim Anokhin	10
9	(Switzerland) Max Heinzer	15
56	(Argentina) José Dominguez	9
41	(Denmark) Patrick Jørgensen	15
24	(Chinese Taipei) Cheng Tsung-Lin	12
25	(Spain) Álvaro Ibáñez	13
40	(Czech Republic) Martin Rubeš	15
57	(Japan) Satoru Uyama	15
8	(South Korea) Kweon Young-jun	9

Round of 32
64	(Luxembourg) Flavio Giannotte	14
32	(Germany) Richard Schmidt	15
17	(Kazakhstan) Ruslan Kurbanov	15
49	(Czech Republic) Jiří Beran	14
9	(Switzerland) Max Heinzer	15
41	(Denmark) Patrick Jørgensen	7
40	(Czech Republic) Martin Rubeš	8
57	(Japan) Satoru Uyama	9

Round of 16
32	(Germany) Richard Schmidt	15
17	(Kazakhstan) Ruslan Kurbanov	13
9	(Switzerland) Max Heinzer	12
57	(Japan) Satoru Uyama	13

Quarterfinals
32	(Germany) Richard Schmidt	15
57	(Japan) Satoru Uyama	13

==== Section 2 ====
Round of 64
5	(Japan) Kazuyasu Minobe	11
60	(France) Jean-Michel Lucenay	15
37	(Hungary) Zsombor Bányai	15
28	(Cuba) Yunior Venet	9
21	(Spain) Yulen Pereira	15
44	(China) Xue Yangdong	8
53	(Brazil) Fabrizio Lazaroto	5
12	(Italy) Enrico Garozzo	15
13	(Italy) Paolo Pizzo	15
52	(Russia) Nikita Glazkov	14
45	(Russia) Sergey Khodos	9
20	(Russia) Pavel Sukhov	15
29	(Netherlands) Bas Verwijlen	15
36	(Sweden) Robin Kase	12
61	(Switzerland) Michele Niggeler	8
4	(South Korea) Park Kyoung-doo	10

Round of 32
60	(France) Jean-Michel Lucenay	15
37	(Hungary) Zsombor Bányai	6
21	(Spain) Yulen Pereira	9
12	(Italy) Enrico Garozzo	15
13	(Italy) Paolo Pizzo	15
20	(Russia) Pavel Sukhov	13
29	(Netherlands) Bas Verwijlen	12
4	(South Korea) Park Kyoung-doo	8

Round of 16
60	(France) Jean-Michel Lucenay	15
12	(Italy) Enrico Garozzo	11
13	(Italy) Paolo Pizzo	15
29	(Netherlands) Bas Verwijlen	10

Quarterfinals
60	(France) Jean-Michel Lucenay	14
13	(Italy) Paolo Pizzo	15

=== Bottom half ===
==== Section 3 ====
Round of 64
3	(Italy) Marco Fichera	14
62	(Egypt) Mahmoud Mohsen	5
35	(Hungary) Péter Somfai	11
30	(Estonia) Sten Priinits	15
19	(Morocco) Houssam Elkord	7
46	(Italy) Andrea Santarelli	15
51	(Uzbekistan) Javokhirbek Nurmatov	11
14	(France) Daniel Jérent	15
11	(Venezuela) Rubén Limardo	15
54	(Romania) Adrian Dabija	14
43	(Kazakhstan) Dmitriy Alexanin	9
22	(China) Song Hong-jie	15
27	(Israel) Ido Herpe	12
38	(Senegal) Alexandre Bouzaid	15
59	(France) Ronan Gustin	6
6	(Estonia) Nikolai Novosjolov	15

Round of 32
3	(Italy) Marco Fichera	15
30	(Estonia) Sten Priinits	8
46	(Italy) Andrea Santarelli	9
14	(France) Daniel Jérent	15
11	(Venezuela) Rubén Limardo	12
22	(China) Song Hong-jie	10
38	(Senegal) Alexandre Bouzaid	13
6	(Estonia) Nikolai Novosjolov	15

Round of 16
3	(Italy) Marco Fichera	13
14	(France) Daniel Jérent	15
11	(Venezuela) Rubén Limardo	8
6	(Estonia) Nikolai Novosjolov	15

Quarterfinals
14	(France) Daniel Jérent	14
6	(Estonia) Nikolai Novosjolov	15

==== Section 4 ====
Round of 64
7	(South Korea) Jung Jin-sun	15
58	(China) Lan Minghao	14
39	(Netherlands) Tristan Tulen	4
26	(Hungary) András Rédli	15
23	(Ukraine) Anatoliy Herey	15
42	(Greece) Savvas Kavvadias	10
55	(Uzbekistan) Oleg Sokolov	12
10	(Ukraine) Bohdan Nikishyn	15
15	(Switzerland) Benjamin Steffen	15
50	(Mauritius) Satya Gunput	7
47	(Serbia) Danilo Nikolić	10
18	(Japan) Koki Kano	15
31	(Germany) Lukas Bellmann	7
34	(Argentina) Jesús Lugones Ruggeri	15
63	(Switzerland) Georg Kuhn	15
2	(France) Yannick Borel	12

Round of 32
7	(South Korea) Jung Jin-sun	12
26	(Hungary) András Rédli	15
23	(Ukraine) Anatoliy Herey	13
10	(Ukraine) Bohdan Nikishyn	15
15	(Switzerland) Benjamin Steffen	11
18	(Japan) Koki Kano	15
34	(Argentina) Jesús Lugones Ruggeri	15
63	(Switzerland) Georg Kuhn	7

Round of 16
26	(Hungary) András Rédli	6
10	(Ukraine) Bohdan Nikishyn	3
18	(Japan) Koki Kano	5
34	(Argentina) Jesús Lugones Ruggeri	15

Quarterfinals
26	(Hungary) András Rédli	15
34	(Argentina) Jesús Lugones Ruggeri	8
