= Fencing at the 2020 Summer Olympics – Men's team épée =

Men's team épée at the Games of the XXXII Olympiad
- Olympic fencing
- Venue: Makuhari Messe
- Date: 30 July 2021
- Competitors: 34 from 9 nations

Medalists
1st place, gold medalist(s)		Koki Kano; Kazuyasu Minobe; Masaru Yamada; Satoru Uyama	Japan
2nd place, silver medalist(s)		Sergey Bida; Sergey Khodos; Pavel Sukhov; Nikita Glazkov	ROC
3rd place, bronze medalist(s)		Park Sang-young; Ma Se-geon; Song Jae-ho; Kweon Young-jun	South Korea

The men's team épée event at the 2020 Summer Olympics took place on 30 July 2021 at the Makuhari Messe. 27 fencers (9 teams of 3) from 9 nations competed. The competition was won by Japan, with Russian Olympic athletes taking silver and South Korea bronze. The previous medal of Russia in men's team épée was in 1996; Japan and South Korea never medaled in this event. The 2016 champions and silver medalist, Italy and France, did not make it to the semifinals, the bronze medalist, Hungary, did not quality for the Olympics.

== Background ==
This will be the 25th appearance of the event, which has been held at every Summer Olympics since 1908 except 2012 (during the time when team events were rotated off the schedule, with only two of the three weapons for each of the men's and women's categories).

The reigning Olympic champion is France (Gauthier Grumier, Yannick Borel, Daniel Jérent, and Jean-Michel Lucenay); France has won the last three Olympic Games. France is also the reigning World Champion, with Borel, Jérent, Ronan Gustin, and Alexandre Bardenet on the 2019 winning team.

== Qualification ==
A National Olympic Committee (NOC) could enter a team of 3 fencers in the men's team épée. These fencers also automatically qualified for the individual event.

There are 8 dedicated quota spots for men's team épée. They are allocated as through the world team ranking list of 5 April 2021. The top 4 spots, regardless of geographic zone, qualify (France, Italy, Ukraine, and Switzerland). The next four spots are allocated to separate geographic zones, as long as an NOC from that zone is in the top 16. These places went to South Korea (Asia/Oceania), the United States (Americas), and ROC (Europe); no team from Africa was in the top 16, so the place was reallocated to the next-best team regardless of zone: China.

Additionally, there are 8 host/invitational spots that can be spread throughout the various fencing events. Japan qualified one men's épée fencer through normal individual qualification and used two host quota places to complete a men's épée team.

The COVID-19 pandemic delayed many of the events for qualifying for fencing, moving the close of the rankings period back to April 5, 2021 rather than the original April 4, 2020.

== Competition format ==
The 2020 tournament is a single-elimination tournament, with classification matches for all places. Each match features the three fencers on each team competing in a round-robin, with 9 three-minute bouts to 5 points; the winning team is the one that reaches 45 total points first or is leading after the end of the nine bouts. Standard épée rules regarding target area, striking, and priority are used.

== Schedule ==
The competition is held over a single day, Friday, 30 July. The first session runs from 10 a.m. to approximately 3:20 p.m. (when all matches except the bronze and gold medal finals are expected to conclude), after which there is a break until 6:30 p.m. before the medal bouts are held.

All times are Japan Standard Time (UTC+9)

Date	Time	Round
Friday, 30 July 2021	10:00 18:30	Round of 16; Quarterfinals; Semifinals; Classification 7/8; Classification 5/6; Bronze medal match Gold medal match

== Results ==
Round of 16
United States	39
Japan	45

Quarter-finals
France	44
Japan	45
South Korea	44
Switzerland	39
Ukraine	35
China	45
ROC	45
Italy	34

Semi-finals
Japan	45
South Korea	38
China	38
ROC	45

Final
Japan	45
ROC	36
Bronze medal bout
South Korea	45
China	42

5–8th place classification

5–8th place semifinals
France	45
Switzerland	37
Ukraine	45
Italy	39

Fifth place bout
France	45
Ukraine	39
Seventh place bout
Switzerland	34
Italy	36

== Final classification ==
Rank	Team	Athlete
1st place, gold medalist(s)	Japan	Koki Kano; Kazuyasu Minobe; Masaru Yamada; Satoru Uyama
2nd place, silver medalist(s)	ROC	Sergey Bida; Sergey Khodos; Pavel Sukhov; Nikita Glazkov
3rd place, bronze medalist(s)	South Korea	Park Sang-young; Ma Se-geon; Song Jae-ho; Kweon Young-jun
4	China	Dong Chao; Lan Minghao; Wang Zijie
5	France	Alexandre Bardenet; Yannick Borel; Romain Cannone; Ronan Gustin
6	Ukraine	Ihor Reizlin; Bohdan Nikishyn; Roman Svichkar; Anatoliy Herey
7	Italy	Andrea Santarelli; Enrico Garozzo; Gabriele Cimini; Marco Fichera
8	Switzerland	Max Heinzer; Lucas Malcotti; Michele Niggeler; Benjamin Steffen
9	United States	Jacob Hoyle; Curtis McDowald; Yeisser Ramirez
