= Fencing at the 2016 Summer Olympics – Men's épée =

Olympic fencing event

Men's épée at the Games of the XXXI Olympiad
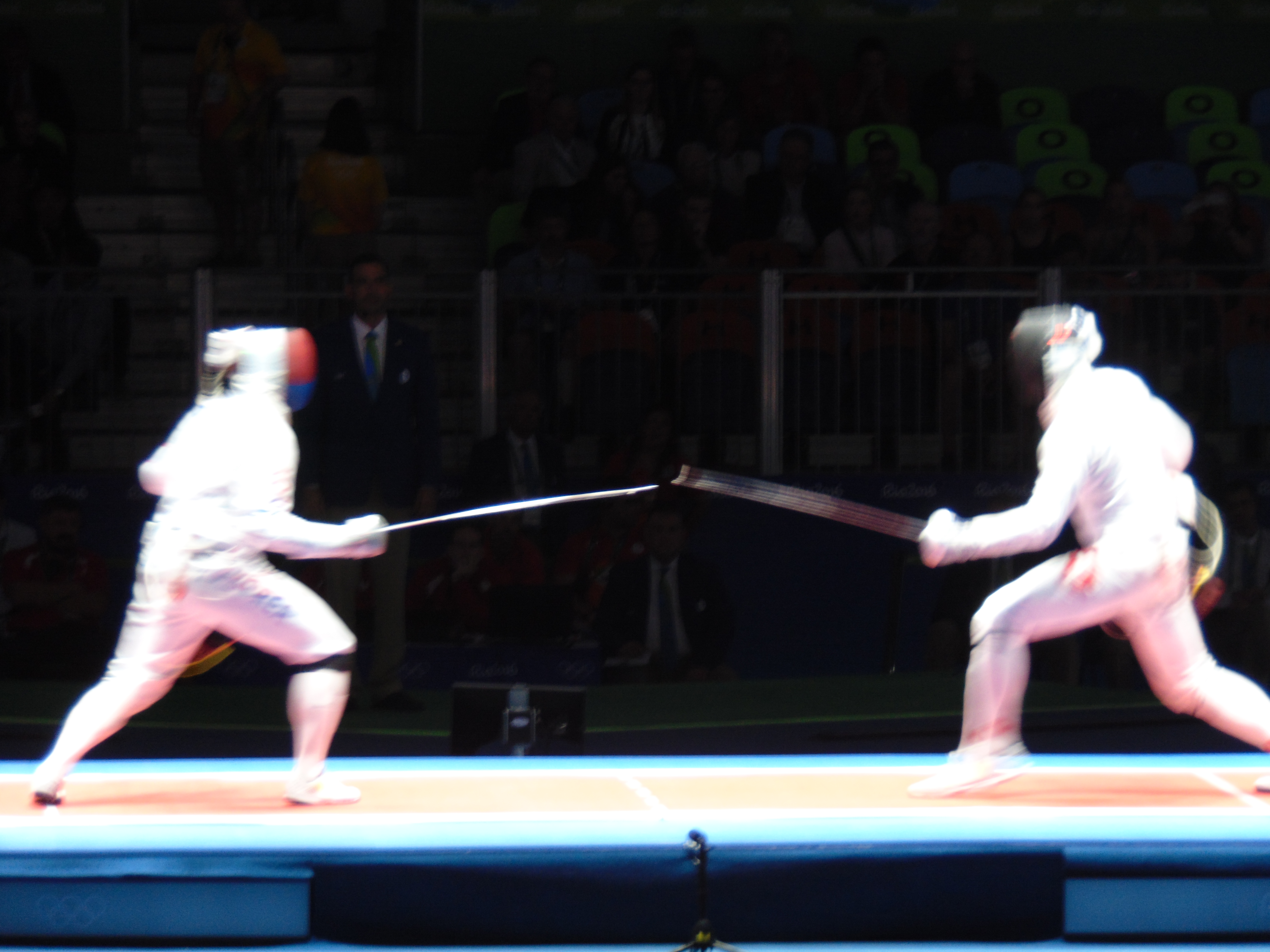
- A bout during the competition
- Venue: Carioca Arena 3
- Date: 9 August 2016
- Competitors: 38 from 20 nations

Medalists
1st place, gold medalist(s)		Park Sang-young	South Korea
2nd place, silver medalist(s)		Géza Imre	Hungary
3rd place, bronze medalist(s)		Gauthier Grumier	France

The men's épée competition in fencing at the 2016 Summer Olympics in Rio de Janeiro was held on 9 August at the Carioca Arena 3. There were 38 competitors from 20 nations. South Korea's Park Sang-young won the individual gold, the first victory for South Korea in the event after bronze medals in 2000 and 2012. Géza Imre took silver, Hungary's first medal in the event since 1996. Imre, at age 41, was the oldest individual fencing medalist since 1952. Gauthier Grumier of France earned bronze.

In the final, Imre led 14-10 before Park scored the final 5 points to win 15–14.

== Background ==
This was the 27th appearance of the event, which was not held at the first Games in 1896 (with only foil and sabre events held) but has been held at every Summer Olympics since 1900.

Five of the eight quarterfinalists from 2012 returned: gold medalist Rubén Limardo of Venezuela, bronze medalist Jung Jin-Sun of South Korea, fifth-place finisher Paolo Pizzo of Italy, sixth-place finisher Silvio Fernández of Venezuela, and seventh-place finisher Yannick Borel of France. Géza Imre of Hungary was the reigning (2015) World Champion; other World Champions competing in the event were Nikolai Novosjolov (2010 and 2013), Anton Avdeev (2009) and Pizzo (2011). France's Gauthier Grumier was the top seed in the tournament.

No nations made their debut in the event, though one Kuwaiti athlete competed as an Independent Olympic Athlete. France and the United States each appeared for the 25th time, tied for most among nations.

== Qualification ==
Nations were limited to three fencers each from 1928 to 2004. However, the 2008 Games introduced a rotation of men's team fencing events with one weapon left off each Games; the individual event without a corresponding team event had the number of fencers per nation reduced to two. Men's épée was the second event this applied to, so each nation could enter a maximum of two fencers in the event in 2012. The team épée was back in 2016 (sabre the missing weapon for men), so the limit was three for 2016.

There were 35 dedicated quota spots for men's épée. The first 24 spots went to the 3 members of each of the 8 qualified teams in the team foil event. Next, 7 more men were selected from the world rankings based on continents: 2 from Europe, 2 from the Americas, 2 from Asia/Oceania, and 1 from Africa. Finally, 4 spots were allocated by continental qualifying events: 1 from Europe, 1 from the Americas, 1 from Asia/Oceania, and 1 from Africa.

Additionally, there were 8 host/invitational spots that could be spread throughout the various fencing events. Brazil used 3 of those places in the men's épée, resulting in a total of 38 competitors.

== Competition format ==
The épée competition, following the format introduced in 1996, consisted of a six-round single-elimination bracket with a bronze medal match between the two semifinal losers. Fencing was done to 15 touches or to the completion of three three-minute rounds if neither fencer reached 15 touches by then. At the end of time, the higher-scoring fencer was the winner; a tie resulted in an additional one-minute sudden-death time period. This sudden-death period was further modified by the selection of a draw-winner beforehand; if neither fencer scored a touch during the minute, the predetermined draw-winner won the bout.

== Schedule ==
All times are Brasília Time (UTC-03:00)

Date	Time	Round
Sunday, 7 August 2016	9:00; 10:15; 12:30; 13:45; 16:00; 17:15; 17:45	Round of 64; Round of 32; Round of 16; Quarterfinals; Semifinals; Bronze medal match Final

== Results ==
=== Top half ===
==== Section 1 ====
Round of 64
Jiří Beran (CZE)	6
Athos Schwantes (BRA)	8

Round of 32
Gauthier Grumier (FRA)	15
Athos Schwantes (BRA)	7
Rubén Limardo (VEN)	5
Ayman Fayez (EGY)	15
Kazuyasu Minobe (JPN)	15
Marco Fichera (ITA)	8
Anton Avdeev (RUS)	15
Bas Verwijlen (NED)	9

Round of 16
Gauthier Grumier (FRA)	15
Ayman Fayez (EGY)	9
Kazuyasu Minobe (JPN)	15
Anton Avdeev (RUS)	12

Quarter-finals
Gauthier Grumier (FRA)	15
Kazuyasu Minobe (JPN)	8

==== Section 2 ====
Round of 64
Nicolas Ferreira (BRA)	9
Francisco Limardo (VEN)	15
Jhon Édison Rodríguez (COL)	15
Dmytro Karyuchenko (UKR)	7

Round of 32
Daniel Jérent (FRA)	14
Francisco Limardo (VEN)	15
Nikolai Novosjolov (EST)	12
Park Kyoung-doo (KOR)	10
Gábor Boczkó (HUN)	15
Alexandre Bouzaid (SEN)	9
Jhon Édison Rodríguez (COL)	8
Géza Imre (HUN)	15

Round of 16
Francisco Limardo (VEN)	12
Nikolai Novosjolov (EST)	15
Gábor Boczkó (HUN)	8
Géza Imre (HUN)	15

Quarter-finals
Nikolai Novosjolov (EST)	9
Géza Imre (HUN)	15

=== Bottom half ===
==== Section 3 ====
Round of 64
Guilherme Melaragno (BRA)	13
Jiao Yunlong (CHN)	15
András Rédli (HUN)	14
Abdulaziz Al-Shatti (IOA)	13

Round of 32
Bohdan Nikishyn (UKR)	15
Jiao Yunlong (CHN)	11
Jason Pryor (USA)	14
Benjamin Steffen (SUI)	15
Fabian Kauter (SUI)	15
Anatoliy Herey (UKR)	9
András Rédli (HUN)	9
Yannick Borel (FRA)	15

Round of 16
Bohdan Nikishyn (UKR)	14
Benjamin Steffen (SUI)	15
Fabian Kauter (SUI)	14
Yannick Borel (FRA)	15

Quarter-finals
Benjamin Steffen (SUI)	15
Yannick Borel (FRA)	10

==== Section 4 ====
Round of 64
Jung Jin-sun (KOR)	15
Silvio Fernández (VEN)	8

Round of 32
Vadim Anokhin (RUS)	15
Maxime Brinck-Croteau (CAN)	14
Paolo Pizzo (ITA)	11
Max Heinzer (SUI)	15
Pavel Sukhov (RUS)	11
Park Sang-young (KOR)	15
Jung Jin-sun (KOR)	11
Enrico Garozzo (ITA)	15

Round of 16
Vadim Anokhin (RUS)	7
Max Heinzer (SUI)	15
Park Sang-young (KOR)	15
Enrico Garozzo (ITA)	12

Quarter-finals
Max Heinzer (SUI)	4
Park Sang-young (KOR)	15

=== Finals ===
Semi-finals
Gauthier Grumier (FRA)	13
Géza Imre (HUN)	15
Benjamin Steffen (SUI)	9
Park Sang-young (KOR)	15

Final
Géza Imre (HUN)	14
Park Sang-young (KOR)	15
Bronze medal match
Gauthier Grumier (FRA)	15
Benjamin Steffen (SUI)	11

== Results summary ==
Rank	Fencer	Nation
1st place, gold medalist(s)	Park Sang-young	South Korea
2nd place, silver medalist(s)	Géza Imre	Hungary
3rd place, bronze medalist(s)	Gauthier Grumier	France
4	Benjamin Steffen	Switzerland
5	Yannick Borel	France
6	Kazuyasu Minobe	Japan
7	Max Heinzer	Switzerland
8	Nikolai Novosjolov	Estonia
9	Enrico Garozzo	Italy
10	Bogdan Nikishin	Ukraine
11	Vadim Anokhin	Russia
12	Fabian Kauter	Switzerland
13	Gábor Boczkó	Hungary
14	Ayman Fayez	Egypt
15	Anton Avdeev	Russia
16	Francisco Limardo	Venezuela
17	Daniel Jerent	France
18	Bas Verwijlen	Netherlands
19	Park Kyoung-doo	South Korea
20	Pavel Sukhov	Russia
21	Rubén Limardo	Venezuela
22	Jason Pryor	United States
23	Alexandre Bouzaid	Senegal
24	Anatoliy Herey	Ukraine
25	Paolo Pizzo	Italy
26	Marco Fichera	Italy
27	Maxime Brinck-Croteau	Canada
28	András Rédli	Hungary
29	Jhon Édison Rodríguez	Colombia
30	Jiao Yunlong	China
31	Jung Jin-sun	South Korea
32	Athos Schwantes	Brazil
33	Jiri Beran	Czech Republic
34	Silvio Fernández	Venezuela
35	Guilherme Melaragno	Brazil
36	Dmytro Karyuchenko	Ukraine
37	Nicolas Ferreira	Brazil
38	Abdulaziz Alshatti	Independent Olympic Athletes
