= Men's team épée at the 2017 World Fencing Championships =

- Venue: Arena Leipzig
- Location: Leipzig, Germany
- Dates: 25 July

Medalists
gold medal	Yannick Borel; Ronan Gustin; Daniel Jérent; Jean-Michel Lucenay	France
silver medal	Max Heinzer; Georg Kuhn; Michele Niggeler; Benjamin Steffen	Switzerland
bronze medal	Nikita Glazkov; Anton Glebko; Sergey Khodos; Pavel Sukhov	Russia

The Men's team épée event of the 2017 World Fencing Championships was held on 25 July 2017.

== Draw ==
=== Championship bracket ===
Round of 64
Australia	31
Chinese Taipei	45
Saudi Arabia	24
Iran	45
Uzbekistan	41
Netherlands	45
Ghana
Romania
Morocco	45
Turkmenistan	36
Sweden	45
Singapore	35

Round of 32
France	45
Australia	26
Brazil	38
Germany	45
Czech Republic	34
Finland	28
Egypt	45
Venezuela	41
Russia	45
Iran	31
Spain	38
Israel	45
Kazakhstan	45
Denmark	42
Netherlands	32
Ukraine	45
South Korea	45
Romania	27
Argentina	35
Estonia	45
China	41
Hong Kong	45
Morocco	28
Hungary	45
Switzerland	45
Colombia	38
Poland	35
Japan	45
United States	24
Canada	15
Sweden	8
Italy	24

Round of 16
France	45
Germany	26
Czech Republic	33
Egypt	34
Russia	45
Israel	36
Kazakhstan	32
Ukraine	45
South Korea	38
Estonia	39
Hong Kong	28
Hungary	36
Switzerland	45
Japan	33
United States	19
Italy	23

Quarterfinals
France	45
Egypt	23
Russia	45
Ukraine	36
Estonia	25
Hungary	26
Switzerland	22
Italy	20

Semifinals
France	45
Russia	43
Hungary	32
Switzerland	37

Final
France	45
Switzerland	43
Third place
Russia	45
Hungary	38

=== 5–8th place bracket ===
5–8th place semifinals
Egypt	28
Ukraine	45
Estonia	41
Italy	43

Fifth place
Ukraine	41
Italy	42
Seventh place
Egypt	34
Estonia	45

=== 9–16th place bracket ===
9–16th place quarterfinals
Germany	41
Czech Republic	45
Israel	44
Kazakhstan	45
South Korea	45
Hong Kong	29
Japan	24
United States	25

9–12th place semifinals
Czech Republic	45
Kazakhstan	39
South Korea	45
United States	35

Ninth place
Czech Republic	35
South Korea	45
Eleventh place
Kazakhstan	22
United States	25

=== 13–16th place bracket ===
13–16th place semifinals
Germany	42
Israel	43
Hong Kong	31
Japan	45

13th place
Israel	37
Japan	45
15th place
Germany	44
Hong Kong	40

== Final ranking ==
Rank	Team
Gold medal	France
Silver medal	Switzerland
Bronze medal	Russia
4	Hungary
5	Italy
6	Ukraine
7	Estonia
8	Egypt
9	South Korea
10	Czech Republic
11	United States
12	Kazakhstan
13	Japan
14	Israel
15	Germany
16	Hong Kong
17	Venezuela
18	China
19	Brazil
20	Canada
21	Argentina
22	Denmark
23	Spain
24	Poland
25	Finland
26	Colombia
27	Morocco
28	Iran
29	Romania
30	Sweden
31	Chinese Taipei
32	Netherlands
33	Uzbekistan
34	Australia
35	Singapore
36	Ghana
37	Saudi Arabia
38	Turkmenistan
