= Fencing at the 2015 European Games – Men's épée =

Men's épée at the 2015 European Games
- Venue: Crystal Hall 3
- Date: 24 June
- Competitors: 35 from 17 nations

Medalists
gold medal	Iván Trevejo	France
silver medal	Sergey Khodos	Russia
bronze medal	Daniel Jérent	France
bronze medal	Bartosz Piasecki	Norway

The men's épée competition at the 2015 European Games in Baku was held on 24 June at the Crystal Hall 3.

== Schedule ==
All times are local (UTC+5).

Date	Time	Event
Wednesday, 24 June 2015	09:00	Preliminaries
Wednesday, 24 June 2015	11:30	Round of 32
Wednesday, 24 June 2015	12:50	Round of 16
Wednesday, 24 June 2015	13:40	Quarterfinals
Wednesday, 24 June 2015	18:30	Semifinals
Wednesday, 24 June 2015	20:00	Final

== Results ==
=== Preliminaries ===
==== Pool A ====
Seed	Athlete	(Denmark)	(Netherlands)	(Hungary)	(Estonia)	(Italy)	(Azerbaijan)	(Bulgaria)	V	B	V/B	HS	HR	Diff.	RP	RT
20	Frederik von der Osten (DEN)		V3	3	4	4	V	V	3	6	0.500	24	20	4	3	14
12	Bas Verwijlen (NED)	0		V	1	4	V	V	3	6	0.500	20	18	2	4	17
30	Márk Hanczvikkel (HUN)	V	3		4	4	4	V	2	6	0.333	25	25	0	5	25
1	Nikolai Novosjolov (EST)	V	V	V		V	4	V	5	6	0.833	29	17	12	1	2
10	Gabriele Cimini (ITA)	V	V	V	2		V	V	5	6	0.833	27	22	5	2	=7
21	Kanan Aliyev (AZE)	3	1	V	V	2		4	2	6	0.333	20	28	–8	6	28
32	Deyan Dobrev (BUL)	2	1	2	1	3	V		1	6	0.167	14	29	–15	7	32

==== Pool B ====
Seed	Athlete	(Azerbaijan)	(Russia)	(Israel)	(France)	(Switzerland)	(Hungary)	(Italy)	V	B	V/B	HS	HR	Diff.	RP	RT
33	Najaf Maharramov (AZE)		2	1	4	4	1	3	0	6	0.000	15	29	–14	7	34
9	Sergey Khodos (RUS)	V		V	3	4	4	V	3	6	0.500	26	25	1	5	18
19	Ido Herpe (ISR)	V	4		V	3	V3	2	3	6	0.500	22	19	3	4	15
2	Yannick Borel (FRA)	V	V	3		V	4	V	4	6	0.667	27	23	4	2	11
26	Bruce Brunold (SUI)	V	V	V	2		3	2	3	6	0.500	22	25	–3	6	23
22	Dániel Berta (HUN)	V	V	2	V	V4		2	4	6	0.667	23	20	3	3	12
11	Marco Fichera (ITA)	V4	4	V3	4	V	V		4	6	0.667	25	19	6	1	10

==== Pool C ====
Seed	Athlete	(Italy)	(Switzerland)	(Russia)	(France)	(Azerbaijan)	(Ukraine)	(Hungary)	V	B	V/B	HS	HR	Diff.	RP	RT
18	Gabriele Bino (ITA)		2	2	2	V	2	V	2	6	0.333	18	26	–8	6	29
23	Michele Niggeler (SUI)	V		4	3	V	3	V	3	6	0.500	25	25	0	5	20
13	Sergey Bida (RUS)	V	V		3	V	2	4	3	6	0.500	24	22	2	3	16
8	Iván Trevejo (FRA)	V	V	V4		V	1	V	5	6	0.833	25	18	7	2	5
29	Vakil Nasibov (AZE)	2	4	2	2		0	3	0	6	0.000	13	30	–17	7	35
3	Bohdan Nikishyn (UKR)	V	V	V	V	V		4	5	6	0.833	29	13	16	1	1
31	Mátyás File (HUN)	4	4	V	3	V	V		3	6	0.500	26	26	0	4	19

==== Pool D ====
Seed	Athlete	(Poland)	(Norway)	(Hungary)	(Switzerland)	(Spain)	(France)	(Russia)	V	B	V/B	HS	HR	Diff.	RP	RT
7	Radosław Zawrotniak (POL)		V4	V	V	V	4	V	5	6	0.833	28	17	11	1	3
24	Bartosz Piasecki (NOR)	3		V4	V	3	2	V	3	6	0.500	22	24	–2	4	22
14	Péter Szényi (HUN)	1	3		V	3	V	4	2	6	0.333	21	24	–3	5	26
15	Florian Staub (SUI)	3	3	4		V	4	4	1	6	0.167	23	27	–4	7	30
4	José Luis Abajo (ESP)	4	V	V4	2		4	2	2	6	0.333	21	26	–5	6	27
27	Ronan Gustin (FRA)	V	V	2	V	V		V	5	6	0.833	27	22	5	2	=7
35	Dmitriy Gusev (RUS)	1	4	V	V	V	3		3	6	0.500	23	25	–2	3	21

==== Pool E ====
Seed	Athlete	(Italy)	(France)	(Finland)	(Azerbaijan)	(Switzerland)	(Russia)	(Latvia)	V	B	V/B	HS	HR	Diff.	RP	RT
15	Andrea Santarelli (ITA)		V	4	V	V	V4	V	5	6	0.833	28	23	5	2	6
5	Daniel Jérent (FRA)	4		2	V	V	V	V	4	6	0.667	26	19	7	3	9
6	Niko Vuorinen (FIN)	V	V		V	4	V	V	5	6	0.833	29	19	10	1	5
35	Mehrab Hasanov (AZE)	3	2	2		4	1	V	1	6	0.167	17	29	–12	6	31
25	Georg Kuhn (SUI)	4	1	V	2		V	V	4	6	0.667	25	26	–1	4	13
16	Anton Glebko (RUS)	3	2	4	V	4		V	2	6	0.333	23	20	3	5	24
27	Mihails Jefremenko (LAT)	4	4	2	4	4	0		0	6	0.000	18	30	–12	7	33

=== Knockout round ===
==== Final ====
Final
5	Iván Trevejo (FRA)	15
18	Sergey Khodos (RUS)	8

==== Top half ====
Round of 32
17	Bas Verwijlen (NED)	15
16	Sergey Bida (RUS)	12
9	Daniel Jérent (FRA)	15
24	Anton Glebko (RUS)	7
25	Márk Hanczvikkel (HUN)	12
8	Ronan Gustin (FRA)	15
21	Dmitriy Gusev (RUS)	12
12	Dániel Berta (HUN)	15
13	Georg Kuhn (SUI)	13
20	Michele Niggeler (SUI)	15

Round of 16
1	Bohdan Nikishyn (UKR)	8
17	Bas Verwijlen (NED)	15
9	Daniel Jérent (FRA)	15
8	Ronan Gustin (FRA)	14
5	Iván Trevejo (FRA)	15
12	Dániel Berta (HUN)	13
20	Michele Niggeler (SUI)	14
4	Niko Vuorinen (FIN)	15

Quarterfinals
17	Bas Verwijlen (NED)	9
9	Daniel Jérent (FRA)	15
5	Iván Trevejo (FRA)	15
4	Niko Vuorinen (FIN)	10

Semifinals
9	Daniel Jérent (FRA)	10
5	Iván Trevejo (FRA)	15

==== Bottom half ====
Round of 32
19	Mátyás File (HUN)	14
14	Frederik von der Osten (DEN)	15
11	Yannick Borel (FRA)	14
22	Bartosz Piasecki (NOR)	15
27	José Luis Abajo (ESP)	15
6	Andrea Santarelli (ITA)	11
7	Gabriele Cimini (ITA)	15
26	Péter Szényi (HUN)	10
23	Bruce Brunold (SUI)	10
10	Marco Fichera (ITA)	15
15	Ido Herpe (ISR)	14
18	Sergey Khodos (RUS)	15

Round of 16
3	Radosław Zawrotniak (POL)	9
14	Frederik von der Osten (DEN)	15
22	Bartosz Piasecki (NOR)	15
27	José Luis Abajo (ESP)	12
7	Gabriele Cimini (ITA)	13
10	Marco Fichera (ITA)	15
18	Sergey Khodos (RUS)	15
2	Nikolai Novosjolov (EST)	12

Quarterfinals
14	Frederik von der Osten (DEN)	14
22	Bartosz Piasecki (NOR)	15
10	Marco Fichera (ITA)	12
18	Sergey Khodos (RUS)	15

Semifinals
22	Bartosz Piasecki (NOR)	12
18	Sergey Khodos (RUS)	15
