= Men's team épée at the 2018 World Fencing Championships =

- Venue: Wuxi Sports Center Indoor Stadium
- Location: Wuxi, China
- Dates: 25 July; 26 July
- Competitors: 132 from 33 nations

Medalists
gold medal	Max Heinzer; Lucas Malcotti; Michele Niggeler; Benjamin Steffen	Switzerland
silver medal	Jung Jin-sun; Kweon Young-jun; Park Kyoung-doo; Park Sang-young	South Korea
bronze medal	Sergey Bida; Nikita Glazkov; Sergey Khodos; Pavel Sukhov	Russia

The Men's team épée event of the 2018 World Fencing Championships was held on 25 and 26 July 2018.

== Draw ==
=== Finals ===
Semifinals
France	38
Switzerland	45
South Korea	45
Russia	35

Final
Switzerland	36
South Korea	31
Third place
France	35
Russia	45

=== Top half ===
==== Section 1 ====
Round of 64

Team 1	Score	Team 2
Iraq	45–37	United Arab Emirates

Round of 32
France	45
Iraq	29
Venezuela	45
Egypt	42
Czech Republic	45
Colombia	24
Sweden	34
United States	39

Round of 16
France	45
Venezuela	32
Czech Republic	36
United States	42

Quarterfinals
France	45
United States	44

==== Section 2 ====
Round of 32
Switzerland	45
Chile	25
Hong Kong	32
Israel	45
Estonia	30
Spain	45
Australia	24
Italy	45

Round of 16
Switzerland	45
Israel	39
Spain	19
Italy	20

Quarterfinals
Switzerland	36
Italy	35

=== Bottom half ===
==== Section 3 ====
Round of 32
South Korea	45
Vietnam	32
Denmark	45
Kazakhstan	38
Japan	36
Poland	25
Finland	23
Hungary	45

Round of 16
South Korea	45
Denmark	37
Japan	25
Hungary	26

Quarterfinals
South Korea	45
Hungary	36

==== Section 4 ====
Round of 32
Ukraine	39
Netherlands	37
Uzbekistan	43
China	44
Germany	45
Argentina	37
Singapore	21
Russia	45

Round of 16
Ukraine	36
China	45
Germany	34
Russia	38

Quarterfinals
China	23
Russia	40

=== Placement rounds ===
==== 5–8th place bracket ====
5–8th place semifinals
United States	30
Italy	45
Hungary	30
China	29

Fifth place
Italy	20
Hungary	33
Seventh place
United States	25
China	26

==== 9–16th place bracket ====
9–16th place quarterfinals
Venezuela	36
Czech Republic	45
Israel	40
Spain	45
Denmark	39
Japan	45
Ukraine	32
Germany	45

9–12th place semifinals
Czech Republic	40
Spain	45
Japan	42
Germany	31

Ninth place
Spain	32
Japan	40
Eleventh place
Czech Republic	11
Germany	9

==== 13–16th place bracket ====
13–16th place semifinals
Venezuela	35
Israel	45
Denmark	35
Ukraine	45

13th place
Israel	35
Ukraine	45
15th place
Venezuela	45
Denmark	38
