= Men's team épée at the 2011 World Fencing Championships =

Event of the 2011 World Fencing Championships

The Men's team épée event of the 2011 World Fencing Championships took place on October 15, 2011.

== Medalists ==
1st place, gold medalist(s)	France; Ronan Gustin; Gauthier Grumier; Jean-Michel Lucenay; Yannick Borel
2nd place, silver medalist(s)	Hungary; Géza Imre; Péter Somfai; Gábor Boczkó; Péter Szényi
3rd place, bronze medalist(s)	Switzerland; Fabian Kauter; Benjamin Steffen; Max Heinzer; Florian Staub

== Draw ==
=== Finals ===
Semifinals
France	45
South Korea	31
Switzerland	23
Hungary	45

Final
France	45
Hungary	37
Third place
South Korea	14
Switzerland	15

=== Top half ===
==== Section 1 ====
Round of 64
France
Bye
Sweden	45
Tunisia	34
Kazakhstan
Bye
Bye
Estonia
Canada
Bye
El Salvador	39
Hong Kong	45
Australia	45
Algeria	28
Bye
Germany

Round of 32
France	45
Sweden	15
Kazakhstan	42
Estonia	45
Canada	45
Hong Kong	25
Australia	32
Germany	45

Round of 16
France	45
Estonia	32
Canada	32
Germany	45

Quarterfinals
France	45
Germany	41

==== Section 2 ====
Round of 64
Russia
Bye
Sierra Leone	0
Israel	0
Kyrgyzstan
Bye
Bye
Norway
Japan
Bye
Bye
Czech Republic
Singapore	39
Lithuania	45
Bye
South Korea

Round of 32
Russia	45
Israel	36
Kyrgyzstan	43
Norway	44
Japan	30
Czech Republic	26
Lithuania	23
South Korea	45

Round of 16
Russia	39
Norway	45
Japan	40
South Korea	42

Quarterfinals
Norway	33
South Korea	45

=== Bottom half ===
==== Section 3 ====
Round of 64
United States
Bye
Portugal	45
Colombia	30
Brazil
Bye
Bye
Switzerland
Poland
Bye
Bye
Netherlands
Iran	0
Democratic Republic of the Congo	0
Bye
Italy

Round of 32
United States	14
Portugal	13
Brazil	31
Switzerland	45
Poland	45
Netherlands	39
Iran	30
Italy	45

Round of 16
United States	26
Switzerland	31
Poland	29
Italy	45

Quarterfinals
Switzerland	36
Italy	33

==== Section 4 ====
Round of 64
China
Bye
Iraq	20
Belarus	45
Egypt
Bye
Bye
Ukraine
Venezuela
Bye
Bye
Spain
Uzbekistan	45
Ivory Coast	23
Bye
Hungary

Round of 32
China	45
Belarus	35
Egypt	45
Ukraine	36
Venezuela	45
Spain	40
Uzbekistan	27
Hungary	45

Round of 16
China	45
Egypt	41
Venezuela	23
Hungary	45

Quarterfinals
China	37
Hungary	45

=== Placement matches ===
==== 5–8th place ====
5–8th place semifinals
Germany	37
Norway	36
Italy	45
China	39

Fifth place
Germany	40
Italy	45
Seventh place
Norway	36
China	37

==== 9–12th place ====
9–16th place quarterfinals
Estonia	37
Canada	45
Russia	41
Japan	42
United States	40
Poland	45
Egypt	26
Venezuela	33

9–12th place semifinals
Canada	30
Japan	45
Poland	35
Venezuela	44

Ninth place
Japan	28
Venezuela	37
11th place
Canada	35
Poland	45

==== 13–16th place ====
13–16th place semifinals
Estonia	44
Russia	45
United States	34
Egypt	45

13th place
Russia	45
Egypt	36
15th place
Estonia	26
United States	45
