= 2016 Hungarian Fencing Championships =

The 2016 Hungarian Fencing Championships were the 111th edition of the Hungarian Fencing Championships, which took place on 25–27 November 2016 at the Gerevich Aladár Nemzeti Sportcsarnok in Budapest.

== Schedule ==
Daily schedule
Date →	Saturday, 26			Sunday, 27		
Men's	Foil individual	Épée individual	Sabre individual	Foil team	Épée team	Sabre team
Women's	Foil individual	Épée individual	Sabre individual	Foil team	Épée team	Sabre team

== Results ==
=== Men's ===
Event	Gold	Silver	Bronze
Individual sabre Miklós Meszéna memorial	András Szatmári; Vasas SC	Tamás Decsi; KVSE	Csanád Gémesi; GEAC Nikolász Iliász; Vasas SC
Individual épée Tamás Gábor memorial	Gergely Siklósi; Balaton	Péter Somfai; BHSE	Zsombor Bányai; Vasas SC András Peterdi; PTE-PEAC
Individual foil dr. András Felkay memorial	Kristóf Szabados; Építők SC	Róbert Gátai; Budakalász	Máté Hári; Terézváros Bálint Mátyás; Törekvés
Team sabre Sándor Forró memorial	Vasas SC; Nikolász Iliász; Pál Nagy; Etele Ravasz; András Szatmári	GEAC 1 Bence Gémesi; Csanád Gémesi; Huba Gémesi; Ákos Morvai	MTK; István Kovács; Miklós Pech; Kristóf Puy; Martin Singer
Team épée dr. László Nedeczky memorial	Vasas SC 1	Balaton	BHSE
