= Vasas SC (disambiguation) =

Vasas SC is a sport society in Angyalföld, Hungary. Vasas SC may also refer to:

- Vasas SC (women's handball), a women's handball club
- Budapest Stars, an ice hockey club
- Vasas SC (men's water polo), a men's water polo club
- Vasas SC (fencing), a fencing club
