= 2011 World Fencing Championships =

International fencing competition

2011 World Championships in Fencing
- Dates: 8 October – 16 October
- Host city: Catania, Italy
- Events: 12

The 2011 World Fencing Championships was held at Catania, Italy from 8–16 October.

== Medal table ==
* Host nation (Italy)

Rank	Nation	Gold	Silver	Bronze	Total
1	Italy*	4	3	4	11
2	Russia	4	0	1	5
3	China	2	2	0	4
4	France	1	1	1	3
5	Romania	1	0	2	3
6	United States	0	1	2	3
7	Germany	0	1	1	2
7	Ukraine	0	1	1	2
9	Belarus	0	1	0	1
9	Hungary	0	1	0	1
9	Netherlands	0	1	0	1
12	South Korea	0	0	4	4
13	Switzerland	0	0	2	2
Totals (13 entries)		12	12	18	42

== Men's events ==
Event	Gold	Silver	Bronze
Individual Épée	Paolo Pizzo (ITA)	Bas Verwijlen (NED)	Fabian Kauter (SUI); Park Kyoung-doo (KOR)
Team Épée	France; Ronan Gustin; Gauthier Grumier; Jean-Michel Lucenay; Yannick Borel	Hungary; Géza Imre; Péter Somfai; Gábor Boczkó; Péter Szényi	Switzerland; Fabian Kauter; Benjamin Steffen; Max Heinzer; Florian Staub
Individual Foil	Andrea Cassarà (ITA)	Valerio Aspromonte (ITA)	Giorgio Avola (ITA); Victor Sintès (FRA)
Team foil	China; Zhang Liangliang; Lei Sheng; Zhu Jun; Ma Jianfei	France; Marcel Marcilloux; Victor Sintès; Erwann Le Péchoux; Brice Guyart	Germany; Sebastian Bachmann; Peter Joppich; Benjamin Kleibrink; Andre Wessels
Individual Sabre	Aldo Montano (ITA)	Nicolas Limbach (GER)	Gu Bon-gil (KOR); Luigi Tarantino (ITA)
Team sabre	Russia; Nikolay Kovalev; Veniamin Reshetnikov; Aleksey Yakimenko; Pavel Bykov	Belarus; Valery Pryiemka; Aliaksandr Buikevich; Dmitri Lapkes; Aliaksei Likhacheuski	Italy; Diego Occhiuzzi; Aldo Montano; Gianpiero Pastore; Luigi Tarantino

== Women's events ==
Event	Gold	Silver	Bronze
Individual Épée	Li Na (CHN)	Sun Yujie (CHN)	Ana Maria Brânză (ROU); Anca Măroiu (ROU)
Team Épée	Romania; Anca Măroiu; Loredana Dinu; Simona Alexandru; Ana Maria Brânză	China; Luo Xiaojuan; Li Na; Sun Yujie; Xu Anqi	Italy; Rossella Fiamingo; Mara Navarria; Nathalie Moellhausen; Bianca Del Carretto
Individual Foil	Valentina Vezzali (ITA)	Elisa Di Francisca (ITA)	Lee Kiefer (USA); Nam Hyun-hee (KOR)
Team foil	Russia; Inna Deriglazova; Aida Shanayeva; Larisa Korobeynikova; Yevgeniya Lamonova	Italy; Arianna Errigo; Valentina Vezzali; Elisa Di Francisca; Ilaria Salvatori	South Korea; Lee Hye-sun; Nam Hyun-hee; Jeon Hee-sook; Jung Gil-ok
Individual Sabre	Sofiya Velikaya (RUS)	Mariel Zagunis (USA)	Yuliya Gavrilova (RUS); Olha Kharlan (UKR)
Team sabre	Russia; Ekaterina Dyachenko; Sofiya Velikaya; Yuliya Gavrilova; Dina Galiakbarova	Ukraine; Olena Khomrova; Halyna Pundyk; Olha Kharlan; Olha Zhovnir	United States; Ibtihaj Muhammad; Mariel Zagunis; Dagmara Wozniak; Daria Schneider
