= Nébald =

Nébald is a surname. Notable people with the surname include:

- György Nébald (born 1956), Hungarian fencer
- Ildikó Mincza-Nébald (born 1969), Hungarian fencer
- Rudolf Nébald (born 1952), Hungarian fencer
