= Men's team épée at the 2019 World Fencing Championships =

- Venue: SYMA Sports and Conference Centre
- Location: Budapest, Hungary
- Dates: 21–22 July

Medalists
gold medal	Alexandre Bardenet; Yannick Borel; Ronan Gustin; Daniel Jérent	France
silver medal	Anatoliy Herey; Bohdan Nikishyn; Ihor Reizlin; Roman Svichkar	Ukraine
bronze medal	Max Heinzer; Lucas Malcotti; Michele Niggeler; Benjamin Steffen	Switzerland

The Men's team épée competition at the 2019 World Fencing Championships was held on 21 and 22 July 2019.

== Draw ==
=== Finals ===
Semifinals
China	24
Ukraine	38
France	45
Switzerland	27

Final
Ukraine	37
France	45
Third place
China	35
Switzerland	45

=== Top half ===
==== Section 1 ====
Round of 64

Team 1	Score	Team 2
Belgium	45–26	Australia
Turkmenistan	22–45	Colombia
Cuba	45–30	Tajikistan

Round of 32
Russia	45
Belgium	23
Czech Republic	28
Kazakhstan	45
China	34
Colombia	29
Cuba	34
United States	45

Round of 16
Russia	45
Kazakhstan	44
China	45
United States	44

Quarterfinals
Russia	41
China	45

==== Section 2 ====
Round of 64

Team 1	Score	Team 2
Kyrgyzstan	35–45	Chile
Uzbekistan	45–31	South Africa

Round of 32
Hungary	45
Chile	24
Hong Kong	40
Ukraine	45
Germany	45
Netherlands	33
Uzbekistan	30
Italy	45

Round of 16
Hungary	36
Ukraine	45
Germany	31
Italy	39

Quarterfinals
Ukraine	37
Italy	34

=== Bottom half ===
==== Section 3 ====
Round of 64

Team 1	Score	Team 2
Kuwait	19–45	Brazil
Canada	45–34	Mexico

Round of 32
South Korea	45
Brazil	31
Egypt	42
Denmark	45
Spain	38
Estonia	45
Canada	35
France	45

Round of 16
South Korea	45
Denmark	43
Estonia	39
France	45

Quarterfinals
South Korea	28
France	45

==== Section 4 ====
Round of 64

Team 1	Score	Team 2
Thailand	40–45	Morocco
Argentina	45–43	Saudi Arabia
Vietnam	45–34	Singapore

Round of 32
Japan	45
Morocco	25
Argentina	30
Israel	45
Venezuela	37
Poland	33
Vietnam	34
Switzerland	45

Round of 16
Japan	35
Israel	35
Venezuela	34
Switzerland	45

Quarterfinals
Israel	34
Switzerland	45

=== Placement rounds ===
==== 5–8th place bracket ====
5–8th place semifinals
Russia	33
Italy	35
South Korea	45
Israel	41

Fifth place
Italy	45
South Korea	25
Seventh place
Russia	45
Israel	42

==== 9–16th place bracket ====
9–16th place quarterfinals
Kazakhstan	45
United States	44
Hungary	45
Germany	27
Denmark	45
Estonia	34
Japan	45
Venezuela	31

9–12th place semifinals
Kazakhstan	41
Hungary	40
Denmark	37
Japan	45

Ninth place
Kazakhstan	44
Japan	45
Eleventh place
Hungary	45
Denmark	36

==== 13–16th place bracket ====
13–16th place semifinals
United States	43
Germany	42
Estonia	45
Venezuela	31

13th place
United States	39
Estonia	45
15th place
Germany	45
Venezuela	39

== Final ranking ==
Rank	Team
1st place, gold medalist(s)	France
2nd place, silver medalist(s)	Ukraine
3rd place, bronze medalist(s)	Switzerland
4	China
5	Italy
6	South Korea
7	Russia
8	Israel
9	Japan
10	Kazakhstan
11	Hungary
12	Denmark
13	United States
14	Estonia
15	Germany
16	Venezuela
17	Spain
18	Czech Republic
19	Poland
20	Egypt
21	Netherlands
22	Hong Kong
23	Argentina
24	Colombia
25	Cuba
26	Morocco
27	Canada
28	Chile
29	Uzbekistan
30	Brazil
31	Vietnam
32	Belgium
33	Australia
34	Singapore
35	Kuwait
36	South Africa
37	Kyrgyzstan
38	Mexico
39	Thailand
40	Tajikistan
41	Turkmenistan
42	Saudi Arabia
