= Ronan Gustin =

French fencer (born 1987)

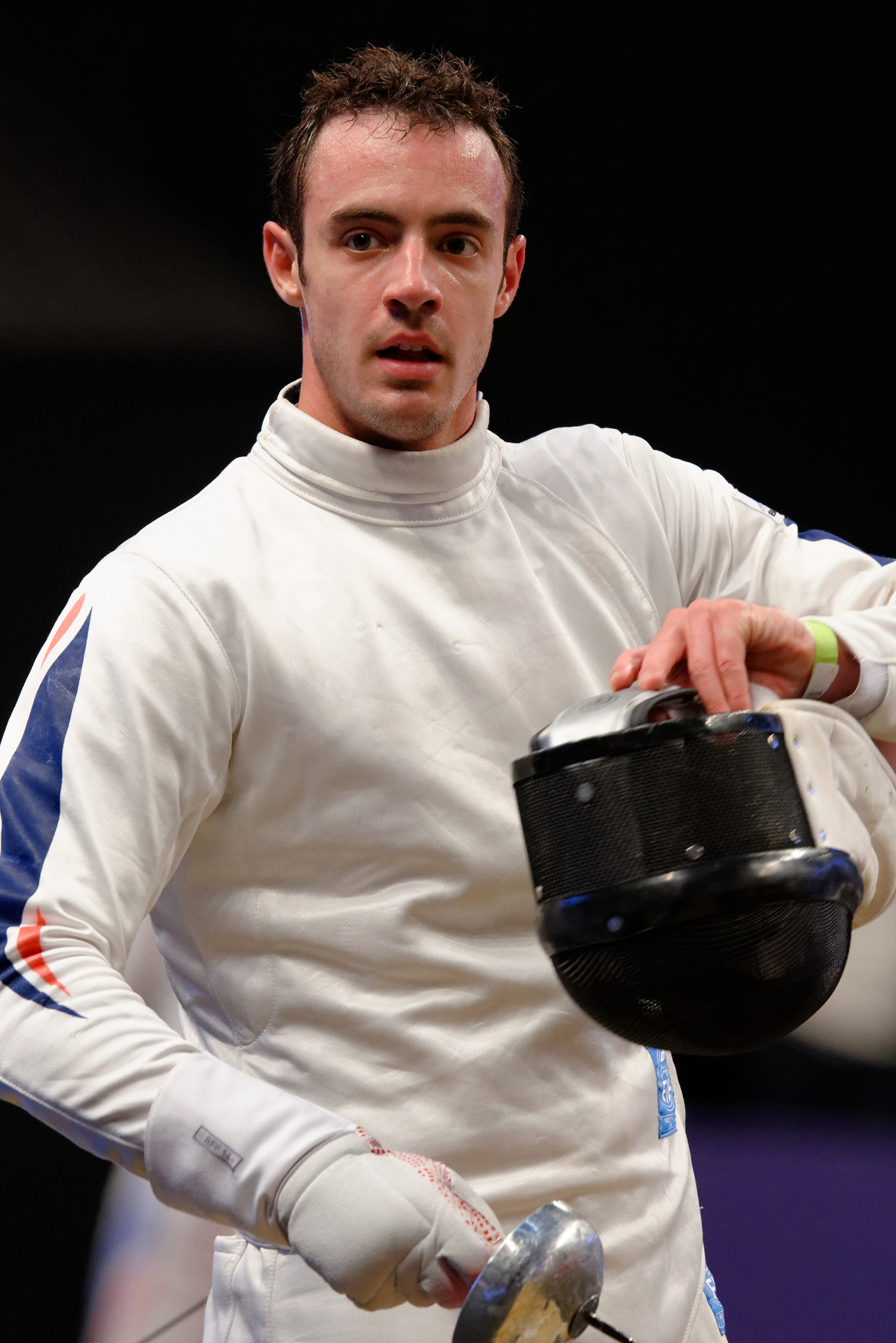

Personal information
- Nickname: Galopin
- Born: 17 August 1987 (age 39) Fontaine-lès-Dijon, France
- Height: 1.90 m (6 ft 3 in)
- Weight: 83 kg (183 lb)

Fencing career
- Sport: Fencing
- Country: France
- Weapon: Épée
- Hand: right-handed
- National coach: Hugues Obry
- Club: Livry-Gargan / PF INSEP
- FIE ranking: current ranking
Medal record
World Championships
Gold medal – first place	2011 Catania	Team
Gold medal – first place	2017 Leipzig	Team
Gold medal – first place	2019 Budapest	Team
European Games
Gold medal – first place	2015 Baku	Team
European Championships
Gold medal – first place	2011 Sheffield	Team
Gold medal – first place	2015 Montreux	Team
Silver medal – second place	2018 Novi Sad	Team

Ronan Gustin (born 17 August 1987) is a French épée fencer, team European and World champion in 2011.

== Career ==
Gustin took up fencing at the early age of three at ASPTT Dijon. His junior results were unremarkable, but his build and motivation had him noticed by national coach Jérôme Roussat, who invited him to train with the French national team at INSEP, first as a guest in 2008, then as a full member in 2010, after he was silver medallist in the 2009 French national championship.

In his first senior season he earned a bronze medal at the 2011 Heidenheim World Cup and a silver medal at the 2011 Stockholm Grand Prix. These results caused him to be selected for the 2011 European Championships in Sheffield. In the individual event Gustin defeated Hungary's Géza Imre and Switzerland's Benjamin Steffen, but fell to Max Heinzer, also from Switzerland, in the table of 16. In the team event France overcame successively Switzerland, Ukraine and Hungary to win the gold medal.

Gustin was selected again in the team for the 2011 World Championships in Catania. In the individual event he was eliminated in the second round by future Olympic champion Rubén Limardo of Venezuela. Gustin finished the 2010–11 season No.17 in world rankings, a career best as of 2015. In the team event the so-called “Invincibles”, who had dominated men's épée with seven consecutive Olympic and World titles, added an eighth one to their collection after defeating successively Sweden, Estonia, Germany, South Korea and Hungary.

The following seasons were more difficult. Gustin did not get any significant result in the World Cup, failed to qualify to the 2012 Summer Olympics in London and was dropped from the French national team. The 2014–15 season saw his return to form with a quarter-finals finish at the Tallinn World Cup, then his first World Cup victory in Vancouver.

France's Daniel Jérent initially qualified to fence in the individual and team épée events at the Tokyo 2020 Olympics, but was banned from participating due to a positive urine test for a banned product. Gustin was accordingly recalled to be a team replacement.
