= Lucas Malcotti =

Swiss épée fencer

Personal information
- Born: 9 January 1995 (age 31)

Fencing career
- Sport: Fencing
- Country: Switzerland
- Weapon: Épée
- Hand: right-handed
- FIE ranking: current ranking
Medal record
Men's épée
Representing Switzerland
World Championships
Gold medal – first place	2018 Wuxi	Team
Gold medal – first place	2026 Hong Kong	Individual
Bronze medal – third place	2019 Budapest	Team
World Cup
Gold medal – first place	2023 Bern	Individual

Lucas Malcotti (born 9 January 1995) is a Swiss épée fencer.

He participated at the 2019 World Fencing Championships, winning a medal.
