= Péter Somfai =

Hungarian fencer

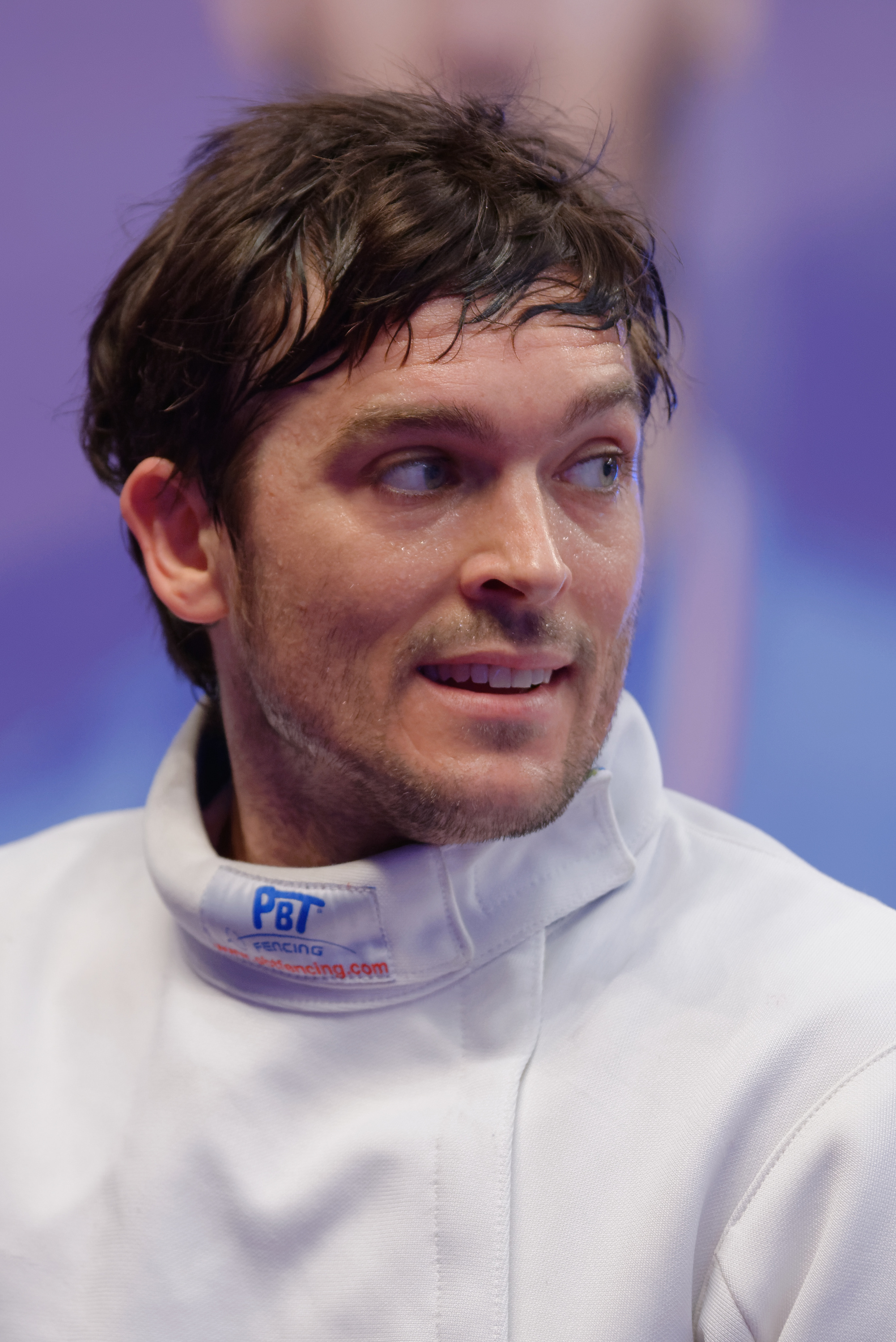
- Somfai at the 2016 Paris World Cup

Personal information
- Born: 2 April 1980 (age 46)

Fencing career
- Sport: Fencing
- Weapon: Épée
- Hand: right-handed
- National coach: Gábor Udvarhelyi
- Club: Bp. Honvéd
- FIE ranking: current ranking
Medal record
Representing Hungary
Olympic Games
Bronze medal – third place	2016 Rio de Janeiro	Team épée
World Championships
Silver medal – second place	2009 Antalya	Team épée
Silver medal – second place	2011 Catania	Team épée
Bronze medal – third place	2010 Paris	Team épée
Bronze medal – third place	2012 Kiev	Team épée
European Championships
Gold medal – first place	2009 Leipzig	Team épée
Gold medal – first place	2010 Leipzig	Team épée
Silver medal – second place	2011 Sheffield	Team épée
Silver medal – second place	2012 Legnano	Team épée
Hungarian Fencing Championships
Silver medal – second place	2016 Budapest	Team épée

Péter Somfai (born 2 April 1980) is a Hungarian épée fencer, team silver medal in the 2009 and 2011 World Championships and team gold medal in the 2009 and 2010 European Championships.

His best results in the Fencing World Cup are bronze medals in the Koweit City Grand Prix and the Doha Grand Prix in 2009.
