= 2017 World Fencing Championships =

2017 edition of the World Fencing Championships

- Dates: 19–26 July
- Host city: Leipzig, Germany
- Venue: Arena Leipzig
- Events: 12

The 2017 World Fencing Championships was held at the Arena Leipzig in Leipzig, Germany from 19 to 26 July 2017.

During the championships there was a demonstration of wheelchair fencing. Russian Ksenia Ovsyannikova was Head of the Promotion Commission of IWAS and Pal Szekeres IWAS Wheelchair Fencing Chairman and Udo Ziegler IWAS Secretary General was also present at the Arena Leipzig Stadium.

== Schedule ==
●	Opening Ceremony	Q	Qualifying	●	Finals	●	Closing Ceremony

July	19	20	21	22	23	24	25	26	Total
Ceremonies			●					●	
Foil Individual	Women	Men	Women		Men				2
Épée Individual	Men	Women		Men	Women				2
Epee Individual	Men	Women	Men	Women					2
fencing Team						Men		Women	2
Florete Team							Women	Women	2
Sabre Team						Men	Women		2
Total Gold Medals	0	0	2	2	2	2	2	2	12

== Medal summary ==
=== Medal table ===
Host nation

Rank	Nation	Gold	Silver	Bronze	Total
1	Italy (ITA)	4	1	4	9
2	Russia (RUS)	3	0	3	6
3	South Korea (KOR)	1	2	0	3
4	Estonia (EST)	1	1	1	3
4	Hungary (HUN)	1	1	1	3
6	France (FRA)	1	0	5	6
7	Ukraine (UKR)	1	0	1	2
8	United States (USA)	0	2	0	2
9	Japan (JPN)	0	1	1	2
9	Poland (POL)	0	1	1	2
11	China (CHN)	0	1	0	1
11	Switzerland (SUI)	0	1	0	1
11	Tunisia (TUN)	0	1	0	1
14	Germany (GER)*	0	0	1	1
Totals (14 entries)		12	12	18	42

=== Men's events ===
Event	Gold	Silver	Bronze
Individual épée	Paolo Pizzo; Italy	Nikolai Novosjolov; Estonia	Richard Schmidt; Germany András Rédli; Hungary
Team épée	France; Yannick Borel; Ronan Gustin; Daniel Jérent; Jean-Michel Lucenay	Switzerland; Max Heinzer; Georg Kuhn; Michele Niggeler; Benjamin Steffen	Russia; Nikita Glazkov; Anton Glebko; Sergey Khodos; Pavel Sukhov
Individual foil	Dmitry Zherebchenko; Russia	Toshiya Saito; Japan	Daniele Garozzo; Italy Takahiro Shikine; Japan
Team foil	Italy; Giorgio Avola; Andrea Cassarà; Alessio Foconi; Daniele Garozzo	United States; Miles Chamley-Watson; Race Imboden; Alexander Massialas; Gerek Meinhardt	France; Jérémy Cadot; Enzo Lefort; Erwann Le Péchoux; Julien Mertine
Individual sabre	András Szatmári; Hungary	Gu Bon-gil; South Korea	Kamil Ibragimov; Russia Vincent Anstett; France
Team sabre	South Korea; Gu Bon-gil; Kim Jun-ho; Kim Jung-hwan; Oh Sang-uk	Hungary; Tamás Decsi; Csanád Gémesi; András Szatmári; Áron Szilágyi	Italy; Enrico Berrè; Dario Cavaliere; Luca Curatoli; Luigi Samele

=== Women's events ===
Event	Gold	Silver	Bronze
Individual épée	Tatyana Gudkova; Russia	Ewa Nelip; Poland	Olena Kryvytska; Ukraine Julia Beljajeva; Estonia
Team épée	Estonia; Julia Beljajeva; Irina Embrich; Erika Kirpu; Kristina Kuusk	China; Sun Yiwen; Sun Yujie; Xu Chengzi; Zhu Mingye	Poland; Renata Knapik-Miazga; Ewa Nelip; Magdalena Piekarska; Barbara Rutz
Individual foil	Inna Deriglazova; Russia	Alice Volpi; Italy	Arianna Errigo; Italy Ysaora Thibus; France
Team foil	Italy; Martina Batini; Arianna Errigo; Camilla Mancini; Alice Volpi	United States; Lee Kiefer; Margaret Lu; Nzingha Prescod; Nicole Ross	Russia; Inna Deriglazova; Anastasia Ivanova; Svetlana Tripapina; Adelina Zagidullina
Individual sabre	Olha Kharlan; Ukraine	Azza Besbes; Tunisia	Irene Vecchi; Italy Cécilia Berder; France
Team sabre	Italy; Martina Criscio; Rossella Gregorio; Loreta Gulotta; Irene Vecchi	South Korea; Hwang Seon-a; Kim Ji-yeon; Seo Ji-yeon; Yoon Ji-su	France; Cécilia Berder; Manon Brunet; Charlotte Lembach; Caroline Queroli
