= Péter Szényi =

Hungarian fencer

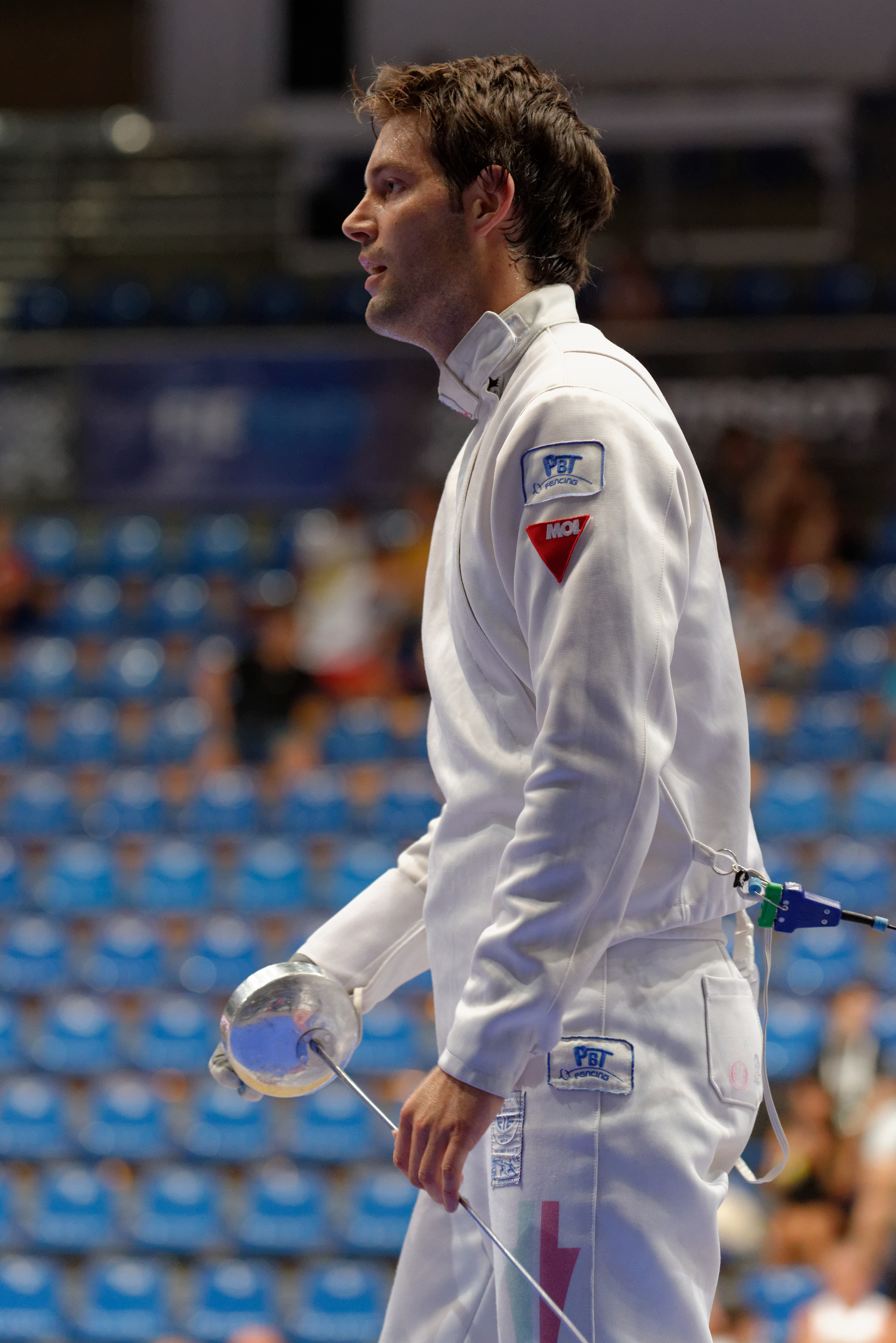
- Szényi at the 2013 World Fencing Championships

Personal information
- Born: 18 March 1987 (age 39) Budapest, Hungary
- Height: 1.92 m (6 ft 3 1/2 in)
- Weight: 89 kg (196 lb)

Fencing career
- Sport: Fencing
- Weapon: épée
- Hand: right-handed
- Club: MTK Vívó Szakosztály
- Head coach: Bertalan Szőcs
- FIE ranking: current ranking
Medal record
Men's épée
Representing Hungary
World Championships
Gold medal – first place	2013 Budapest	Team
Silver medal – second place	2011 Catania	Team
European Championships
Silver medal – second place	2012 Legnano	Team
Silver medal – second place	2013 Zagreb	Team

Péter Szényi (born 18 March 1987) is a Hungarian épée fencer, team world champion in 2013.

== Career ==
Szényi took up fencing after coaches Gábor and Kornél Udvarhelyi came at his school for a sports recruitment event. His first coach was Bertalan Szőcs, who remains his master as of 2013. He won a team silver medal in the 2006 Junior European Championships in Poznan and an individual silver medal in the 2008 U23 European Championships in Monza.

He joined the senior Hungarian team in 2011 and won with them a silver medal in the 2011 World Championships in Catania. The next year he climbed his first individual World Cup podium with a bronze medal in Buenos Aires. He took a team silver medal at the 2012 European Championships in Legnano, then at the 2013 edition in Zagreb. A few months later he earned a team gold medal in the World Championships at home in Budapest.
