= Sergey Khodos =

Russian fencer (born 1986)

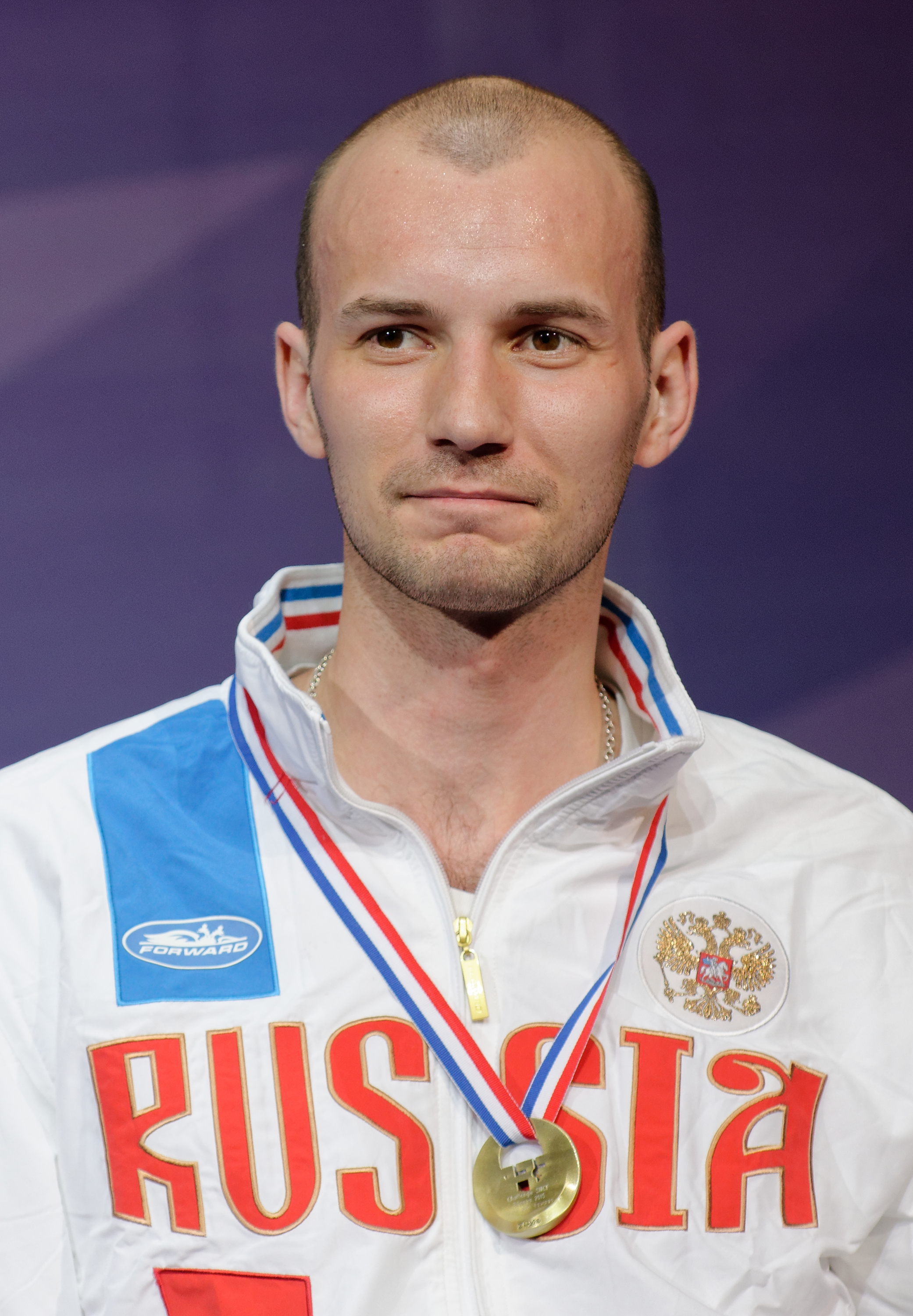
- Khodos in 2015

Personal information
- Nationality: Russian
- Born: 14 July 1986 (age 40) Oskemen, Kazakh SSR
- Height: 1.94 m (6 ft 4 in)
- Weight: 83 kg (183 lb)

Fencing career
- Sport: Fencing
- Weapon: Épée
- Hand: Right-handed
- Club: Central Sports Army Club; SC Vulkan Zvenigorod
- FIE ranking: current ranking
Medal record
Representing (Russia) ROC
Olympic Games
Silver medal – second place	2020 Tokyo	Team épée
Representing Russia
World Championships
Bronze medal – third place	2017 Leipzig	Team épée
Bronze medal – third place	2018 Wuxi	Team épée
European Championships
Gold medal – first place	2017 Tbilisi	Team épée
Gold medal – first place	2018 Novi Sad	Team épée
Gold medal – first place	2019 Düsseldorf	Team épée
Bronze medal – third place	2011 Sheffield	Team épée
Bronze medal – third place	2014 Strasbourg	Team épée
Bronze medal – third place	2017 Tbilisi	Individual épée
European Games
Silver medal – second place	2015 Baku	Individual épée
Silver medal – second place	2015 Baku	Team épée
Summer Universiade
Gold medal – first place	2011 Shenzhen	Team épée
Representing Kazakhstan
Asian Games
Bronze medal – third place	2006 Doha	Team épée
Asian Championships
Silver medal – second place	2007 Nantong	Individual épée

Sergey Viktorovich Khodos (Russian: Сергей Викторович Ходос, IPA: [sʲɪrˈɡʲej ˈxodəs]; born 14 July 1986) is a Russian right-handed épée fencer, three-time team European champion, two-time Olympian, and 2021 team Olympic silver medalist. Khodos competed in the 2016 Rio de Janeiro Olympic Games and the 2020 Tokyo Olympic Games. His clubs are the Central Sports Army Club, and SC Vulkan Zvenigorod.

He first competed for Kazakhstan, winning the team gold medal at the 2006 Junior World Championships, a team bronze medal at the 2006 Asian Games and an individual silver medal. He then switched to Russia, joining the national team in 2010. With them he was team bronze medallist at the 2011 and 2014 European Championships. He placed fourth at the 2010 and 2014 World Championships, also with the team.

== Medal record ==
=== Olympic Games ===
Year	Location	Event	Position
2021	Tokyo, Japan	Team Men's Épée	2nd

=== World Championship ===
Year	Location	Event	Position
2017	Leipzig, Germany	Team Men's Épée	3rd
2018	Wuxi, China	Team Men's Épée	3rd

=== Asian Championship ===
Year	Location	Event	Position
2007	Nantong, China	Individual Men's Épée	2nd

=== European Championship ===
Year	Location	Event	Position
2011	Sheffield, United Kingdom	Team Men's Épée	3rd
2014	Strasbourg, France	Team Men's Épée	3rd
2017	(Georgia (country)) Tbilisi, Georgia	Individual Men's Épée	3rd
2017	(Georgia (country)) Tbilisi, Georgia	Team Men's Épée	1st
2018	Novi Sad, Serbia	Team Men's Épée	1st
2019	Düsseldorf, Germany	Team Men's Épée	1st

=== Grand Prix ===
Date	Location	Event	Position
01/22/2010	Doha, Qatar	Individual Men's Épée	3rd
03/23/2018	Budapest, Hungary	Individual Men's Épée	3rd
