= Park Sang-young =

South Korean fencer (born 1995)

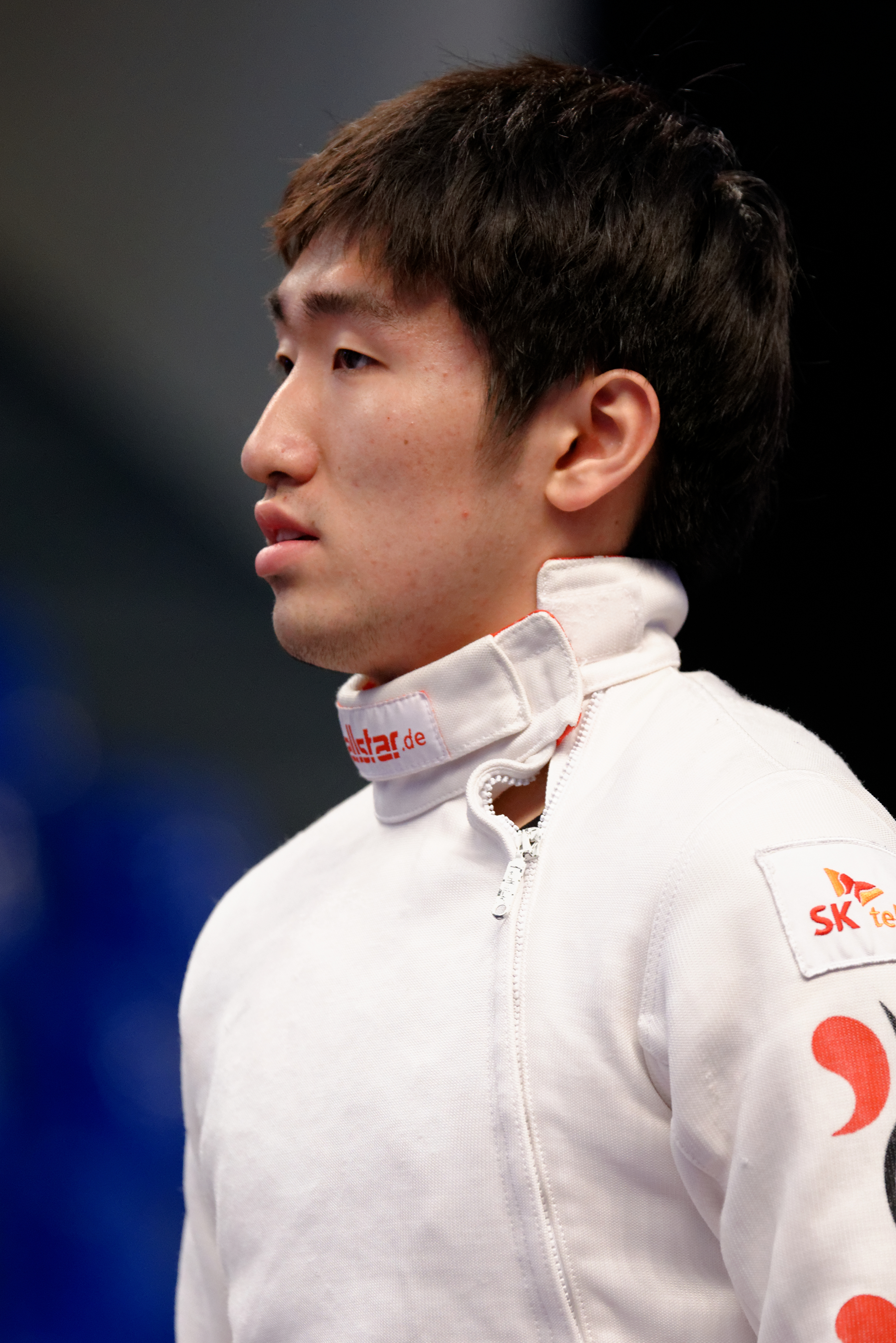
- Park at Trophée Monal 2014

Personal information
- Born: 16 October 1995 (age 30) Jinju, South Gyeongsang Province, South Korea
- Height: 177 cm (5 ft 10 in)

Fencing career
- Sport: Fencing
- Country: South Korea
- Weapon: Épée
- Hand: right-handed
- Club: Ulsan Metropolitan City Hall
- FIE ranking: current ranking
Medal record
Representing South Korea
Olympic Games
Gold medal – first place	2016 Rio de Janeiro	Individual
Bronze medal – third place	2020 Tokyo	Team
World Championships
Silver medal – second place	2014 Kazan	Team
Silver medal – second place	2018 Wuxi	Team
Asian Games
Gold medal – first place	2014 Incheon	Team
Silver medal – second place	2018 Jakarta	Individual
Silver medal – second place	2026 Aichi–Nagoya	Team
Bronze medal – third place	2018 Jakarta	Team
Asian Championships
Gold medal – first place	2014 Suwon	Team
Gold medal – first place	2017 Hong Kong	Team
Silver medal – second place	2016 Wuxi	Team
Silver medal – second place	2016 Wuxi	Individual
Silver medal – second place	2018 Bangkok	Team
Junior World Championships
Gold medal – first place	2012 Moscow	Individual

- Park Sang-young
- Hangul: 박상영
- Hanja: 朴相泳
- RR: Bak Sangyeong
- MR: Pak Sangyŏng

Park Sang-young (Korean pronunciation: [pak̚.s͈aŋ.jʌŋ] or [pak̚] [saŋ.jʌŋ]; born 16 October 1995) is a South Korean right-handed épée fencer, three-time team Asian champion, 2021 team Olympic bronze medalist, and 2016 individual Olympic champion.

== Early life ==
Park was introduced to fencing in middle school. He nearly had to give up the sport as his family could not afford the expensive equipment but financial aid from a non-profit charity and his admission into Gyeongnam Physical Education High School, a public school, allowed him to continue to fencing. During his first year in high school, he won first place in the individual épée category at the national high school championships.

== Career ==
Park was junior world champion in Moscow in 2012, becoming the first South Korean male junior fencer to win a medal in the épée event. He qualified for the senior national team in 2013 by winning the national championship, a rarity for a high school student as fencers generally competed at collegiate level before making the step up. Dubbed a "monster rookie", he made headlines by narrowly defeating veterans Kweon Young-jun and Jung Jin-sun.

Park joined the senior category in the 2013–14 season, during which he won the 2014 Doha Grand Prix and the 2014 Berne Grand Prix. As part of the South Korean team he won a gold medal at the 2014 Asian Fencing Championships in Suwon and at the 2014 Asian Games in Incheon, as well as a silver medal at the 2014 World Fencing Championships. He finished the season world no.3.

The 2014–15 season proved more difficult for Park. He sustained a knee injury while fencing against Pavel Pitra of the Czech Republic in the table of 16 at the March Grand Prix in Budapest, Hungary. The injury prevented him from taking part in the 2015 Asian Championships and the World Championships. He returned to competition a year later, winning a bronze medal in the Vancouver world cup in February 2016.

== Medal record ==
=== Olympic Games ===
Year	Location	Event	Position
2016	Rio de Janeiro, Brazil	Individual Men's Épée	1st
2021	Tokyo, Japan	Team Men's Épée	3rd

=== World Championship ===
Year	Location	Event	Position
2014	Kazan, Russia	Team Men's Épée	2nd
2018	Wuxi, China	Team Men's Épée	2nd

=== Asian Championship ===
Year	Location	Event	Position
2014	Suwon, South Korea	Team Men's Épée	1st
2016	Wuxi, China	Individual Men's Épée	2nd
2016	Wuxi, China	Team Men's Épée	2nd
2017	Hong Kong, China	Team Men's Épée	1st
2019	Tokyo, Japan	Team Men's Épée	2nd
2022	Seoul, South Korea	Individual Men's Épée	3rd
2022	Seoul, South Korea	Team Men's Épée	1st

=== Grand Prix ===
Date	Location	Event	Position
2014-01-16	Doha, Qatar	Individual Men's Épée	1st
2014-05-10	Bern, Switzerland	Individual Men's Épée	1st
2017-12-08	Doha, Qatar	Individual Men's Épée	1st
2018-05-25	Cali, Colombia	Individual Men's Épée	3rd

=== World Cup ===
Date	Location	Event	Position
2016-02-12	Vancouver, Canada	Individual Men's Épée	3rd
2016-11-18	Buenos Aires, Argentina	Individual Men's Épée	1st
2017-10-27	Bern, Switzerland	Individual Men's Épée	1st
2019-05-17	Paris, France	Individual Men's Épée	1st
2020-01-09	Heidenheim, Germany	Individual Men's Épée	2nd

== Personal life ==
Park is a graduate of Korea National Sport University. One of his contemporaries at university was pentathlete Jun Woong-tae, his close friend.
