= Paolo Pizzo =

Italian fencer (born 1983)

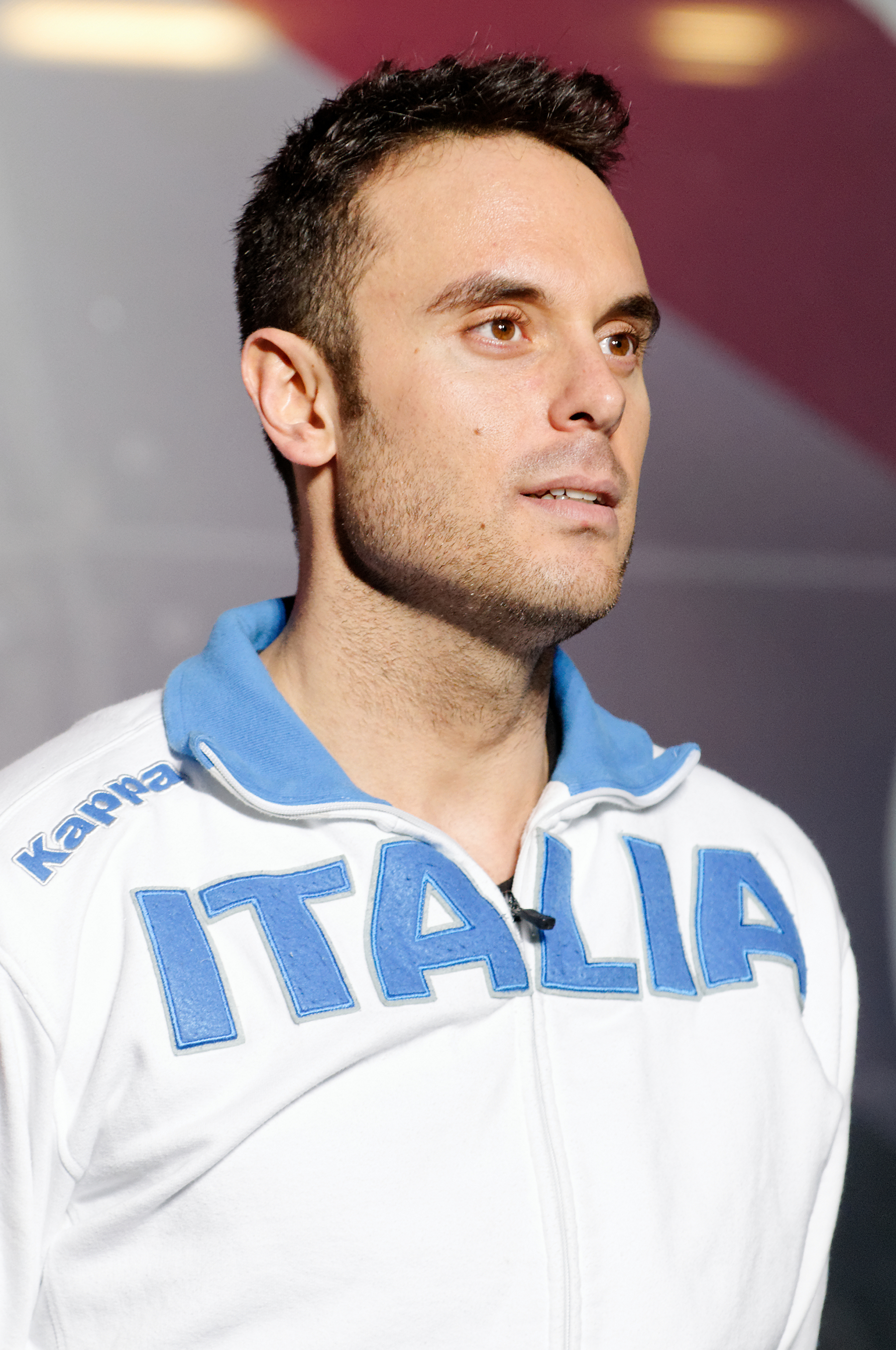

Personal information
- Born: 4 April 1983 (age 43) Catania, Italy

Sport
- Country: Italy
- Sport: Fencing
- Event: Épée
- Club: C.S. Aeronautica Militare
Medal record
Olympic Games
Silver medal – second place	2016 Rio de Janeiro	Team épée
World Championships
Gold medal – first place	2011 Catania	Épée
Gold medal – first place	2017 Leipzig	Épée
European Championships
Silver medal – second place	2014 Strasbourg	Épée
Silver medal – second place	2016 Toruń	Team Épée
Silver medal – second place	2017 Tbilisi	Épée

Paolo Pizzo (born 4 April 1983) is an Italian right-handed épée fencer, two-time individual world champion, two-time Olympian, and 2016 team Olympic silver medalist.

== Biography ==
In 1996, when Paolo Pizzo was 13, he was diagnosed with head cancer that forced him to abandon the sport, then came slow rehabilitation until his first victory came in 2009.

Pizzo competed in the 2012 London Olympic Games and the 2016 Rio de Janeiro Olympic Games, where he won a silver medal in the team men's épée event.

Pizzo won a gold medal in the individual men's épée event at the 2011 World Fencing Championships in Catania, Italy, and a gold medal in the individual men's épée event at the 2017 World Fencing Championships in Leipzig, Germany.

Pizzo won a silver medal in the individual men's épée event at the 2014 European Fencing Championships in Strasbourg, France; a silver medal in the team men's épée event at the 2016 European Fencing Championships in Toruń, Poland; and a silver medal in the individual men's épée event at the 2017 European Fencing Championships in Tbilisi, Georgia.

Between 2009 and 2017, Pizzo won one silver medal and three bronze medals at FIE Men's Épée Grands Prix.

Between 2009 and 2015, Pizzo won two silver medals and five bronze medals at FIE Men's Épée World Cups.

He competed at the 2018 Mediterranean Games.

== Medal Record ==
=== Olympic Games ===
Year	Location	Event	Position
2016	Rio de Janeiro, Brazil	Team Men's Épée	2nd

=== World Championship ===
Year	Location	Event	Position
2011	Catania, Italy	Individual Men's Épée	1st
2017	Leipzig, Germany	Individual Men's Épée	1st

=== European Championship ===
Year	Location	Event	Position
2014	Strasbourg, France	Individual Men's Épée	2nd
2016	Toruń, Poland	Team Men's Épée	2nd
2017	(Georgia (country)) Tbilisi, Georgia	Individual Men's Épée	2nd

=== Grand Prix ===
Date	Location	Event	Position
2009-03-06	Stockholm, Sweden	Individual Men's Épée	2nd
2010-01-22	Doha, Qatar	Individual Men's Épée	3rd
2010-01-29	Legnano, Italy	Individual Men's Épée	3rd
2017-12-08	Doha, Qatar	Individual Men's Épée	3rd

=== World Cups ===
Date	Location	Event	Position
2009-02-07	Lisbon, Portugal	Individual Men's Épée	2nd
2009-05-29	Montreal, Canada	Individual Men's Épée	3rd
2011-04-29	Heidenheim, Germany	Individual Men's Épée	2nd
2012-03-02	Tallinn, Estonia	Individual Men's Épée	3rd
2012-03-16	Paris, France	Individual Men's Épée	3rd
2014-11-14	Tallinn, Estonia	Individual Men's Épée	3rd
2015-05-01	Paris, France	Individual Men's Épée	3rd
