= Jean-Michel Lucenay =

French épée fencer (born 1978)

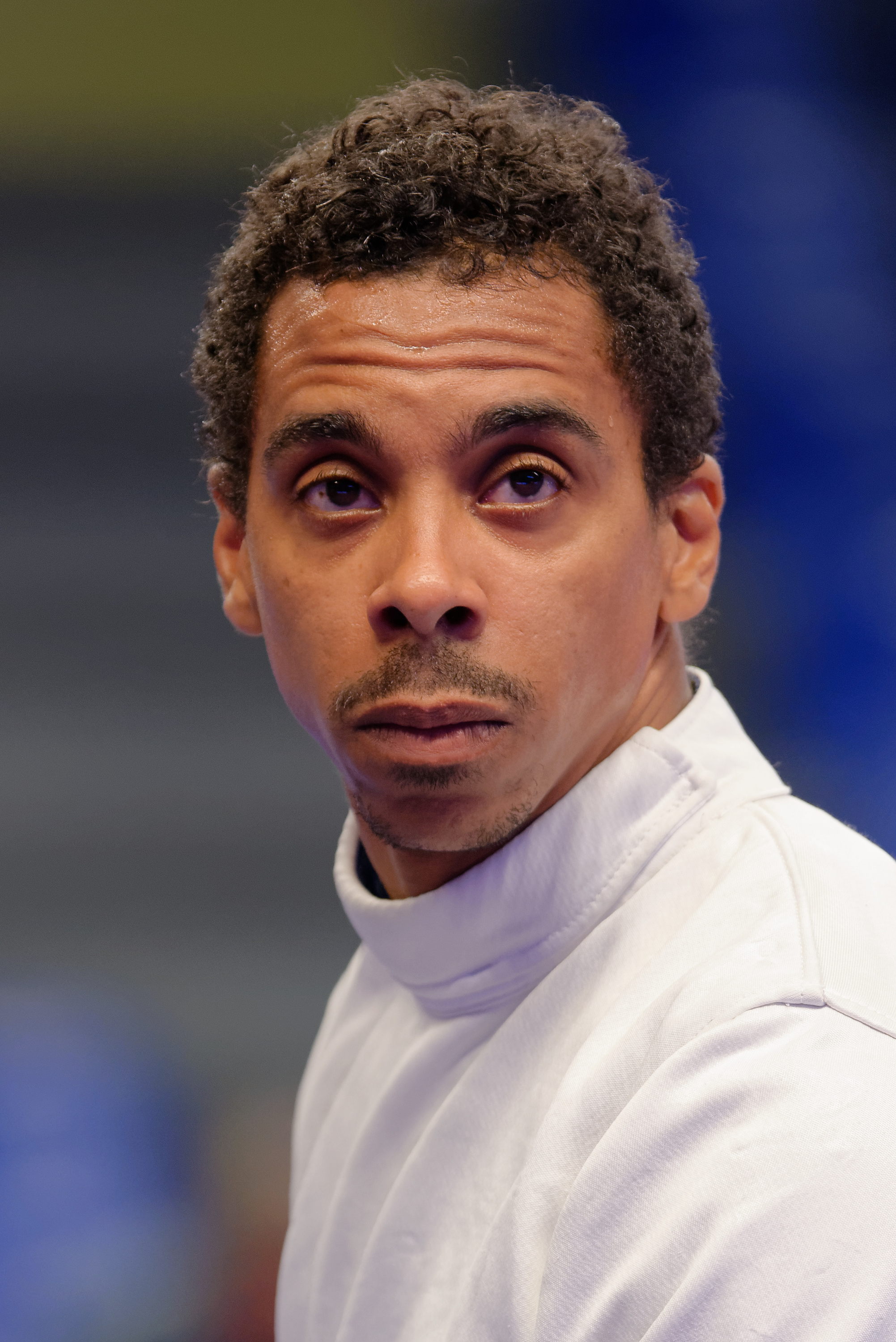
- Lucenay in 2016

Personal information
- Born: 25 April 1978 (age 48) Fort-de-France, Martinique
- Home town: Paris, France
- Height: 1.80 m (5 ft 11 in)
- Weight: 80 kg (176 lb)

Fencing career
- Sport: Fencing
- Country: France
- Weapon: Épée
- Hand: Left
- Years on national team: France
- Club: Aulnay CE
- Head coach: Hugues Obry
- FIE ranking: Current ranking
- Domestic ranking: FFE Profile
Medal record
Olympic Games
Gold medal – first place	2016 Rio de Janeiro	Team épée
World Championships
Gold medal – first place	2002 Lisbon	Team épée
Gold medal – first place	2009 Antalya	Team épée
Gold medal – first place	2011 Catania	Team épée
Gold medal – first place	2014 Kazan	Team épée
Gold medal – first place	2017 Leipzig	Team
Bronze medal – third place	2010 Paris	Individual
European Championships
Gold medal – first place	2003 Bourges	Team épée
Gold medal – first place	2008 Kyiv	Team épée
Gold medal – first place	2010 Leipzig	Individual
Bronze medal – third place	2008 Kyiv	Individual
Bronze medal – third place	2014 Strasbourg	Individual

Jean-Michel Lucenay (born 25 April 1978) is a French épée fencer. He won the gold medal with the French team at the 2016 Summer Olympics in Rio de Janeiro.
