= Pavel Sukhov =

Russian fencer (born 1988)

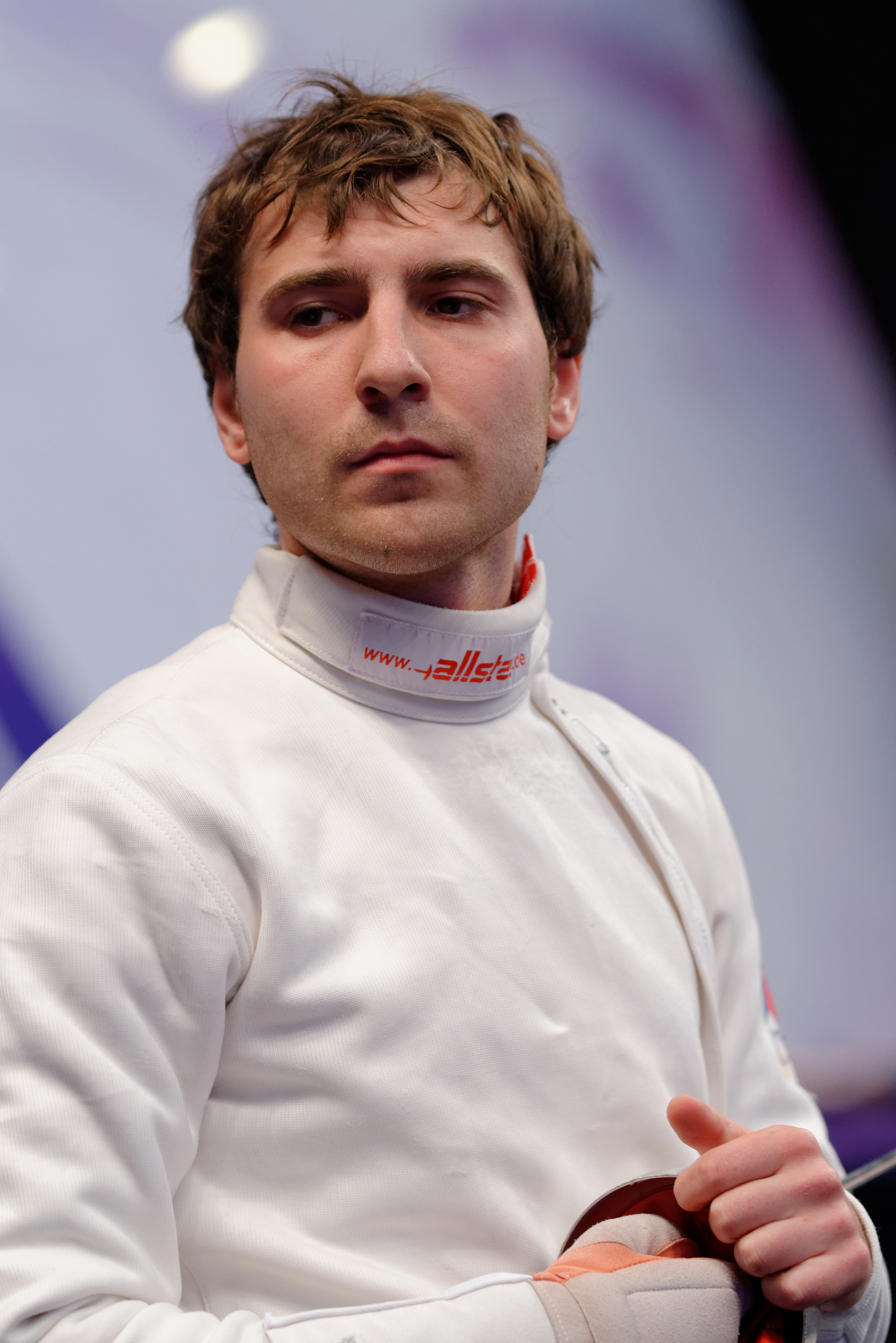
- Sukhov at the 2014 Challenge RFF (Paris World Cup)

Personal information
- Full name: Pavel Vladislavovich Sukhov
- Nationality: (Russia) Russian
- Born: 7 May 1988 (age 38) Samara, Kuybyshev AO, Russian SFSR, Soviet Union (now Russia)
- Height: 1.80 m (5 ft 11 in)
- Weight: 78 kg (172 lb)

Fencing career
- Sport: Fencing
- Country: Russia
- Weapon: Épée
- Hand: Right-handed
- Club: Central Sports Army Club [RUS]; Samara Regional Sports School of Olympic Reserve No.5 [RUS].
- FIE ranking: current ranking
Medal record
Representing (Russia) ROC
Olympic Games
Silver medal – second place	2020 Tokyo	Team épée
Representing Russia
World Championships
Bronze medal – third place	2013 Budapest	Individual épée
Bronze medal – third place	2017 Leipzig	Team épée
Bronze medal – third place	2018 Wuxi	Team épée
European Championships
Gold medal – first place	2012 Legnano	Individual épée
Gold medal – first place	2017 Tbilisi	Team épée
Gold medal – first place	2018 Novi Sad	Team épée
Gold medal – first place	2019 Düsseldorf	Team épée
Bronze medal – third place	2010 Leipzig	Individual épée
Bronze medal – third place	2011 Sheffield	Team épée
Bronze medal – third place	2014 Strasbourg	Team épée
Bronze medal – third place	2015 Montreux	Individual épée

Pavel Vladislavovich Sukhov (Russian: Павел Владиславович Сухов, IPA: [ˈpavʲɪl ˈsuxəf]; born 7 May 1988) is a Russian right-handed épée fencer.

Sukhov is a two-time team European champion and 2012 individual European champion. A three-time Olympian, he is a 2021 team Olympic silver medalist. Sukhov competed in the 2012 London Olympic Games, the 2016 Rio de Janeiro Olympic Games, and the 2020 Tokyo Olympic Games.

== Career ==
Sukhov began fencing at the age of 9. He originally played tennis but switched to fencing when his coach moved abroad. He made his international debut for Russia at the 2008 Doha World Cup, and is a Russian Armed Forces Athlete. His clubs are the Russian Central Sports Army Club, and the Samara Regional Sports School of Olympic Reserve No. 5.

== Medal record ==
=== Olympic Games ===
Year	Location	Event	Position
2021	Tokyo, Japan	Team Men's Épée	2nd

=== World Championship ===
Year	Location	Event	Position
2013	Budapest, Hungary	Individual Men's Épée	3rd
2017	Leipzig, Germany	Team Men's Épée	3rd
2018	Wuxi, China	Team Men's Épée	3rd

=== European Championship ===
Year	Location	Event	Position
2010	Leipzig, Germany	Individual Men's Épée	3rd
2011	Sheffield, United Kingdom	Team Men's Épée	3rd
2012	Legnano, Italy	Individual Men's Épée	1st
2014	Strasbourg, France	Team Men's Épée	3rd
2015	Montreux, Switzerland	Individual Men's Épée	3rd
2017	(Georgia (country)) Tbilisi, Georgia	Team Men's Épée	1st
2018	Novi Sad, Serbia	Team Men's Épée	1st

=== World Cup ===
Date	Location	Event	Position
03/26/2010	Heidenheim, Germany	Individual Men's Épée	1st
05/02/2014	Paris, France	Individual Men's Épée	1st
05/20/2016	Paris, France	Individual Men's Épée	2nd
