= Gauthier Grumier =

French fencer (born 1984)

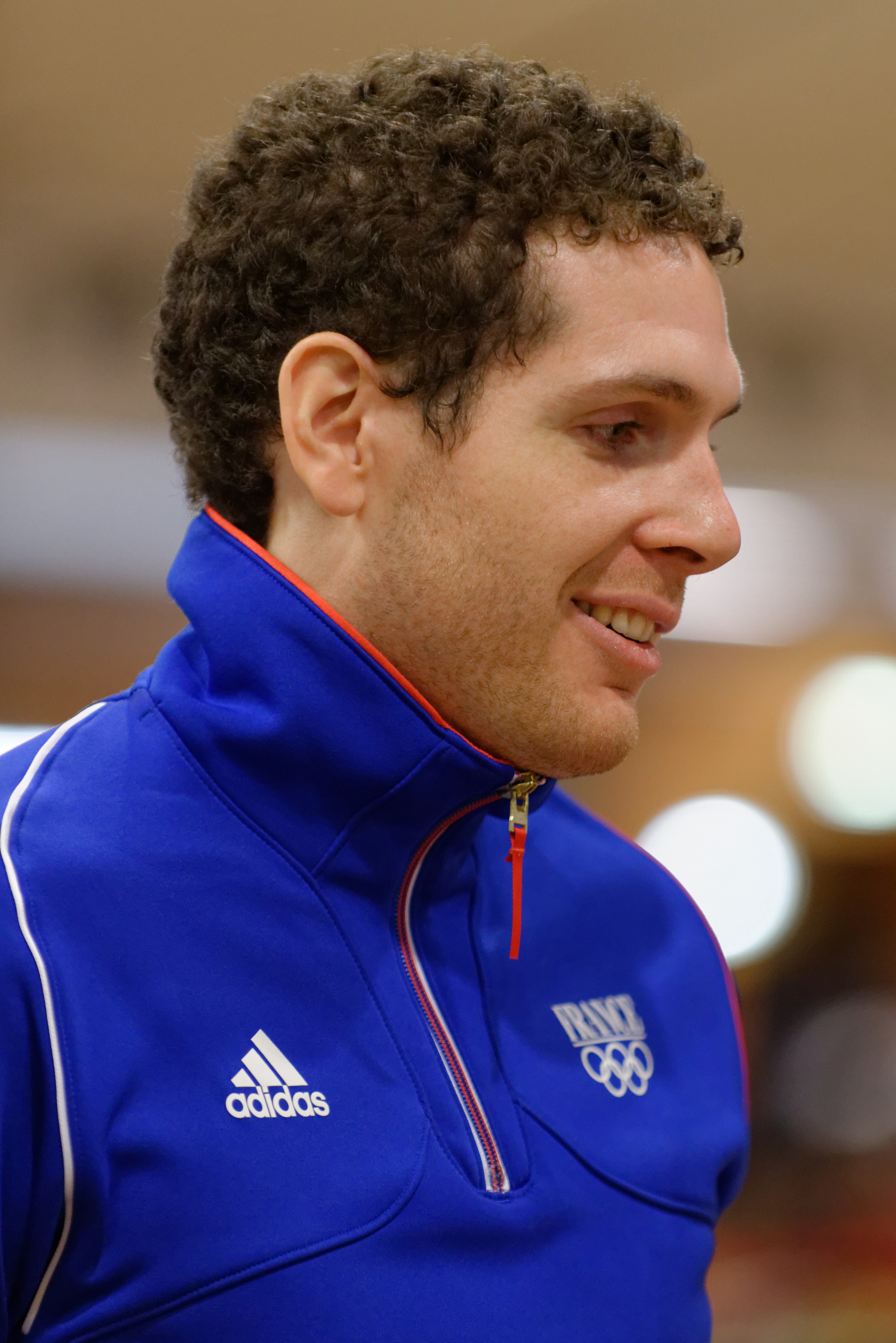
- Challenge RFF-Trophée Monal 2013

Personal information
- Born: May 29, 1984 (age 42) Nevers, France
- Height: 188 cm (6 ft 2 in)
- Weight: 84 kg (185 lb)

Fencing career
- Sport: Fencing
- Country: France
- Weapon: Épée
- Hand: Left
- Club: Levallois Sporting Club Escrime
- Retired: 2016
- Highest ranking: 1
- FIE ranking: Current ranking
Medal record
Men's fencing
Representing France
Olympic Games
Gold medal – first place	2016 Rio de Janeiro	Team épée
Bronze medal – third place	2016 Rio de Janeiro	Individual
World Championships
Gold medal – first place	2006 Torino	Team
Gold medal – first place	2009 Antalya	Team
Gold medal – first place	2010 Paris	Team
Gold medal – first place	2011 Catania	Team
Gold medal – first place	2014 Kazan	Team
Silver medal – second place	2010 Paris	Individual
Silver medal – second place	2012 Kyiv	Team
Silver medal – second place	2015 Moscow	Individual
Bronze medal – third place	2014 Kazan	Individual
European Championships
Gold medal – first place	2003 Bourges	Team
Gold medal – first place	2011 Sheffield	Team
Gold medal – first place	2015 Montreux	Individual
Gold medal – first place	2015 Montreux	Team
Gold medal – first place	2016 Torún	Team
Bronze medal – third place	2009 Plovdiv	Individual
Mediterranean Games
Gold medal – first place	2005 Almería	Individual
Gold medal – first place	2009 Pescara	Individual

Gauthier Grumier (born 29 May 1984, in Nevers) is a French left-handed épée fencer.

Grumier is a three-time team European champion, 2015 individual European champion, and five-time team world champion.

A two-time Olympian, Grumier is a 2016 team Olympic champion and 2016 individual Olympic bronze medalist.

== Career ==
Grumier won the gold medal in the épée team event at the 2006 World Fencing Championships after beating Spain in the final. He accomplished this with his teammates Érik Boisse, Ulrich Robeiri and Fabrice Jeannet. He was also part of the French teams that won in 2010, 2011 and 2014. He won the silver medal in the individual épée event at the 2010 World Fencing Championships and at the 2015 World Fencing Championships.

Grumier competed in the 2012 London Olympic Games and the 2016 Rio de Janeiro Olympic Games.

1/4 finals of the Challenge Réseau Ferré de France–Trophée Monal 2012: Gauthier Grumier (left) and Diego Confalonieri (right).

He began fencing at the age of 3, taken along to training sessions by his father, who was a fencing coach.

== Medal Record ==
=== Olympic Games ===
Year	Location	Event	Position
2016	Rio de Janeiro, Brazil	Individual Men's Épée	3rd
2016	Rio de Janeiro, Brazil	Team Men's Épée	1st

=== World Championship ===
Year	Location	Event	Position
2006	Turin, Italy	Team Men's Épée	1st
2009	Antalya, Turkey	Team Men's Épée	1st
2010	Paris, France	Individual Men's Épée	2nd
2010	Paris, France	Team Men's Épée	1st
2011	Catania, Italy	Team Men's Épée	1st
2012	Kyiv, Ukraine	Team Men's Épée	2nd
2014	Kazan, Russia	Individual Men's Épée	3rd
2014	Kazan, Russia	Team Men's Épée	1st
2015	Moscow, Russia	Individual Men's Épée	2nd

=== European Championship ===
Year	Location	Event	Position
2009	Plovdiv, Bulgaria	Individual Men's Épée	3rd
2011	Sheffield, United Kingdom	Team Men's Épée	1st
2015	Montreux, Switzerland	Individual Men's Épée	1st
2015	Montreux, Switzerland	Team Men's Épée	1st
2016	Toruń, Poland	Team Men's Épée	1st

=== Grand Prix ===
Date	Location	Event	Position
2006-01-27	Kuwait City, Kuwait	Individual Men's Épée	3rd
2009-01-16	Kuwait City, Kuwait	Individual Men's Épée	1st
2009-03-06	Stockholm, Sweden	Individual Men's Épée	3rd
2009-06-12	Bogotá, Colombia	Individual Men's Épée	2nd
2010-01-29	Legnano, Italy	Individual Men's Épée	2nd
2011-06-04	Bern, Switzerland	Individual Men's Épée	3rd
2014-12-05	Doha, Qatar	Individual Men's Épée	3rd
2016-03-18	Budapest, Hungary	Individual Men's Épée	1st

=== World Cup ===
Date	Location	Event	Position
2003-05-02	Heidenheim, Germany	Individual Men's Épée	3rd
2004-05-08	Legnano, Italy	Individual Men's Épée	3rd
2009-02-14	Tallinn, Estonia	Individual Men's Épée	2nd
2009-05-09	Paris, France	Individual Men's Épée	1st
2009-05-29	Montreal, Canada	Individual Men's Épée	1st
2010-03-26	Heidenheim, Germany	Individual Men's Épée	3rd
2011-03-04	Tallinn, Estonia	Individual Men's Épée	2nd
2011-03-18	Paris, France	Individual Men's Épée	3rd
2011-06-17	Buenos Aires, Argentina	Individual Men's Épée	1st
2012-03-02	Tallinn, Estonia	Individual Men's Épée	2nd
2012-04-27	Heidenheim, Germany	Individual Men's Épée	3rd
2014-02-21	Tallinn, Estonia	Individual Men's Épée	3rd
2014-05-23	Buenos Aires, Argentina	Individual Men's Épée	2nd
2014-10-24	Bern, Switzerland	Individual Men's Épée	3rd
2014-11-14	Tallinn, Estonia	Individual Men's Épée	1st
2015-11-13	Tallinn, Estonia	Individual Men's Épée	3rd
2016-01-21	Heidenheim, Germany	Individual Men's Épée	1st
2016-05-20	Paris, France	Individual Men's Épée	1st

=== Mediterranean Games ===
Year	Location	Event	Position
2005	Almería, Spain	Individual Men's Épée	1st
2009	Pescara, Italy	Individual Men's Épée	1st
