= Daniel Jérent =

French fencer (born 1991)

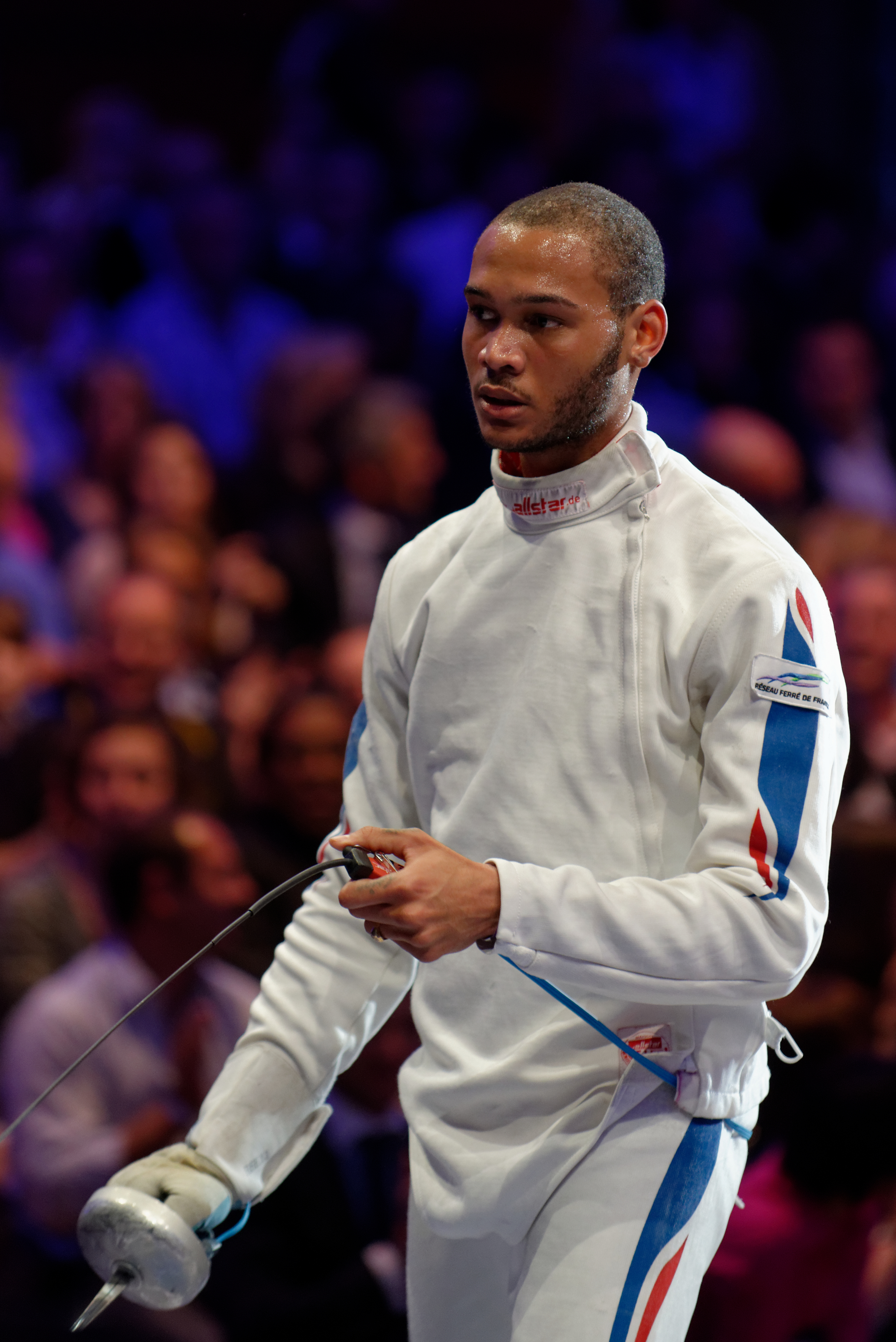
- Jérent at the 2013 Paris World Cup

Personal information
- Born: 4 June 1991 (age 35) Saint-Claude, Guadeloupe
- Height: 1.89 m (6 ft 2 in)
- Weight: 84 kg (185 lb)

Fencing career
- Sport: Fencing
- Country: France
- Weapon: Épée
- Hand: right-handed
- National coach: Hugues Obry
- Club: Levallois. SC / INSEP
- FIE ranking: current ranking
Medal record
Olympic Games
Gold medal – first place	2016 Rio de Janeiro	Team
World Championships
Gold medal – first place	2014 Kazan	Team
Gold medal – first place	2017 Leipzig	Team
Gold medal – first place	2019 Budapest	Team
Bronze medal – third place	2013 Budapest	Team
European Games
Gold medal – first place	2015 Baku	Team
Bronze medal – third place	2015 Baku	Individual
European Championships
Gold medal – first place	2015 Montreux	Team
Gold medal – first place	2016 Toruń	Team
Silver medal – second place	2013 Zagreb	Individual

Daniel Jérent (born 4 June 1991) is a French Épée fencer, team world champion in 2014. He was banned from the 2020 Olympics in Tokyo due to a positive urine test for a banned product, after he had otherwise qualified to fence in the individual and team épée events at the Olympics.

== Career ==
Jérent was born in Guadeloupe, and learnt fencing in Pointe-Noire before joining the centre for promising young fencers in Reims and transferring to Lagardère Paris Racing. He earned a team gold medal at the 2008 Cadets European Championships in Rovigo, and a team bronze medal at the 2011 Junior World Championships at the Dead Sea. He was also French junior champion in 2010 and 2011.

Jérent began fencing in the senior category from the 2009–10 season, reaching the table of 16 at the 2010 Tallinn World Cup. The next season he transferred to Escrime Rodez Aveyron and joined INSEP, a state-sponsored institution for high-performance athletes. He reached the quarter-finals in the Tallinn World Cup, where he was defeated by Gauthier Grumier, and won the team France championship with Rodez. He was selected as reserve into the national team for the European Championships at Legnano, in which France finished 4th.

He made his breakthrough in the 2013–14 season by winning the Paris World Cup after prevailing over fellow countryman Alexandre Blaszyck. At the 2013 European Fencing Championships in Zagreb Jerent made his way to the final, overcoming Olympic silver medallist Bartosz Piasecki along the way. Defeated by Germany's Jörg Fiedler, he came away with a silver medal. His hopes for 2013 World Fencing Championships in Budapest were however cut short in the table of 32 by Korea's Song Jae-ho.

== Suspension and ban ==
Between June 2018 and June 2019, he served 12 months of suspension due to three “no show” breaches during drug testing.

He was banned from the 2020 Olympics in Tokyo due to a positive urine test for a banned product, after he had otherwise qualified to fence in the individual and team épée events at the Olympics. According to the French fencing team, he tested positive for dorzolamide, a diuretic, in both samples A and B that were taken from him. In Japan, Jérent was replaced by Romain Cannone, who competed in the two events in which Jérent was entered, and ended up as Olympic champion in individual épée; Ronan Gustin had been recalled to be a team replacement.
