= Marco Fichera =

Italian fencer (born 1993)

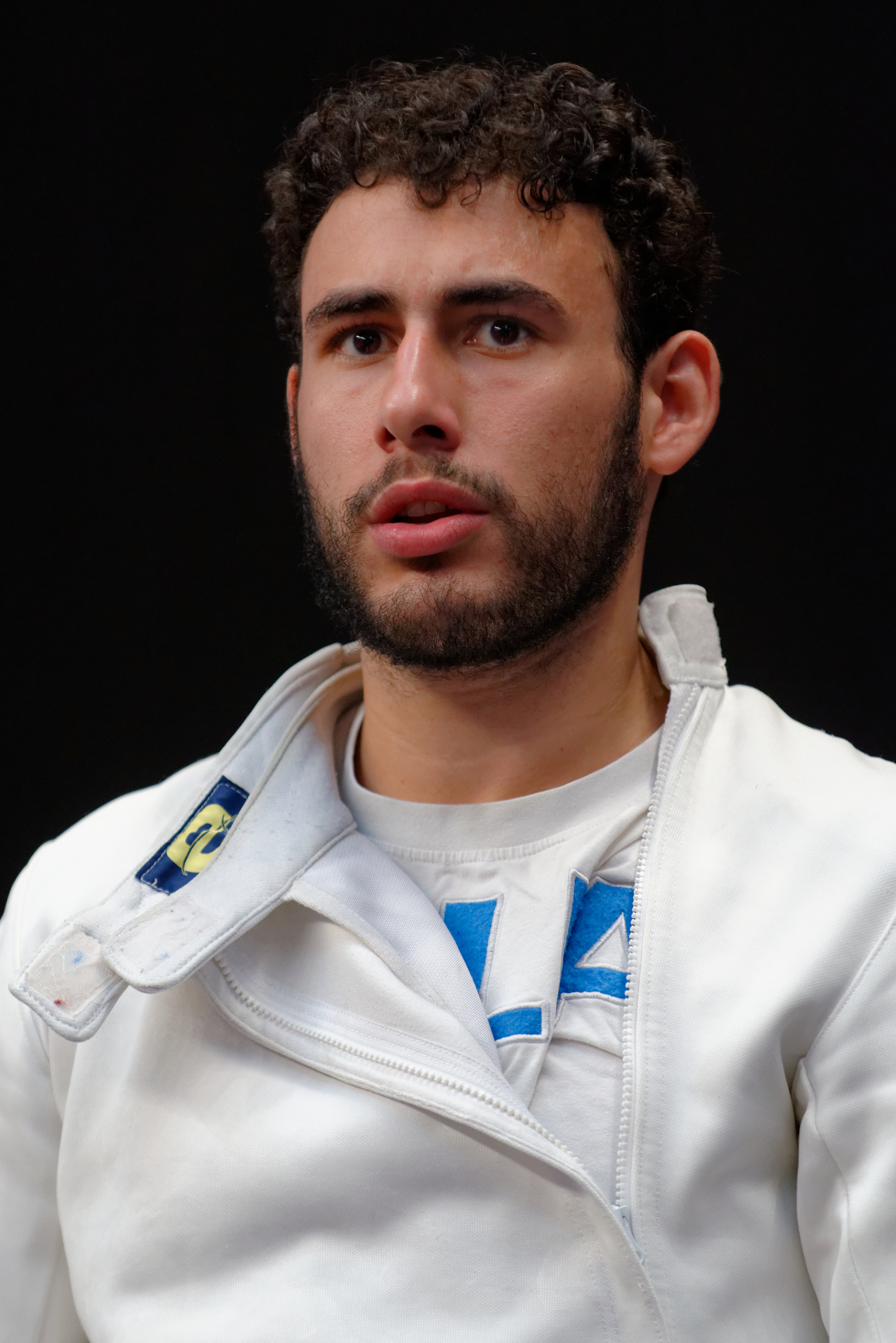

Personal information
- Born: 4 September 1993 (age 33) Acireale, Sicily
- Height: 1.80 m (5 ft 11 in)
- Weight: 74 kg (163 lb)

Fencing career
- Sport: Fencing
- Country: Italy
- Weapon: épée
- Hand: right-handed
- National coach: Sandro Cuomo
- Club: Fiamme Oro
- Head coach: Andrea Candiani
- FIE ranking: current ranking
Medal record
Olympic Games
Silver medal – second place	2016 Rio de Janeiro	Team épée
European Games
Bronze medal – third place	2015 Baku	Team épée
European Championships
Bronze medal – third place	2018 Novi Sad	Team épée

Marco Fichera (born 15 April 1993) is an Italian male épée fencer.

== Career ==
Fichera took up fencing when he was ten years old under the guidance of maestro Domenico Patti at C.S. Acireale. In 2010 he took a double gold haul at the U17 European Championships and an individual silver and a team gold at the U21 European Championships. The same year he took part in the inaugural edition of the Summer Youth Olympics. In the individual event he won the gold medal after being led 9–14 in the final by Germany's Nikolaus Bodoczi. He also earned gold in the mixed team event. These results caused him to be selected into Fiamme Oro, the sports group of the Italian police.

In 2011 Fichera became junior World champion with the team. In early 2013 he transferred to Milan, where he studies political science. In the 2013–14 World Cup he climbed his first World Cup podium with a bronze medal in the Vancouver Grand Prix. He was then called up into the senior Italian national team for the 2014 European Championships.

In 2015 he took part in the inaugural edition of the European Games in Baku. In the team event, Italy lost to France in the semifinals and met Switzerland for the bronze medal. Fichera was chosen to close the match against Switzerland's Fabian Kauter. At 38-38 the match went into extra time. After Kauter struck a hit, the referee erroneously gave the match to Switzerland. The Italian delegation appealed, pointing out the correct rule. Eventually Fichera won his bout, closing on 44-40 for Italy.

In 2016 Fichera suffered a thigh injury during the Paris World Cup. As a precaution ahead of the 2016 Summer Olympics, he was replaced by Lorenzo Buzzi for the 2016 European Championships. Later in June he was officially named into the Italian squad qualified to the Rio Olympics.
