= Benjamin Steffen =

Swiss fencer (born 1982)

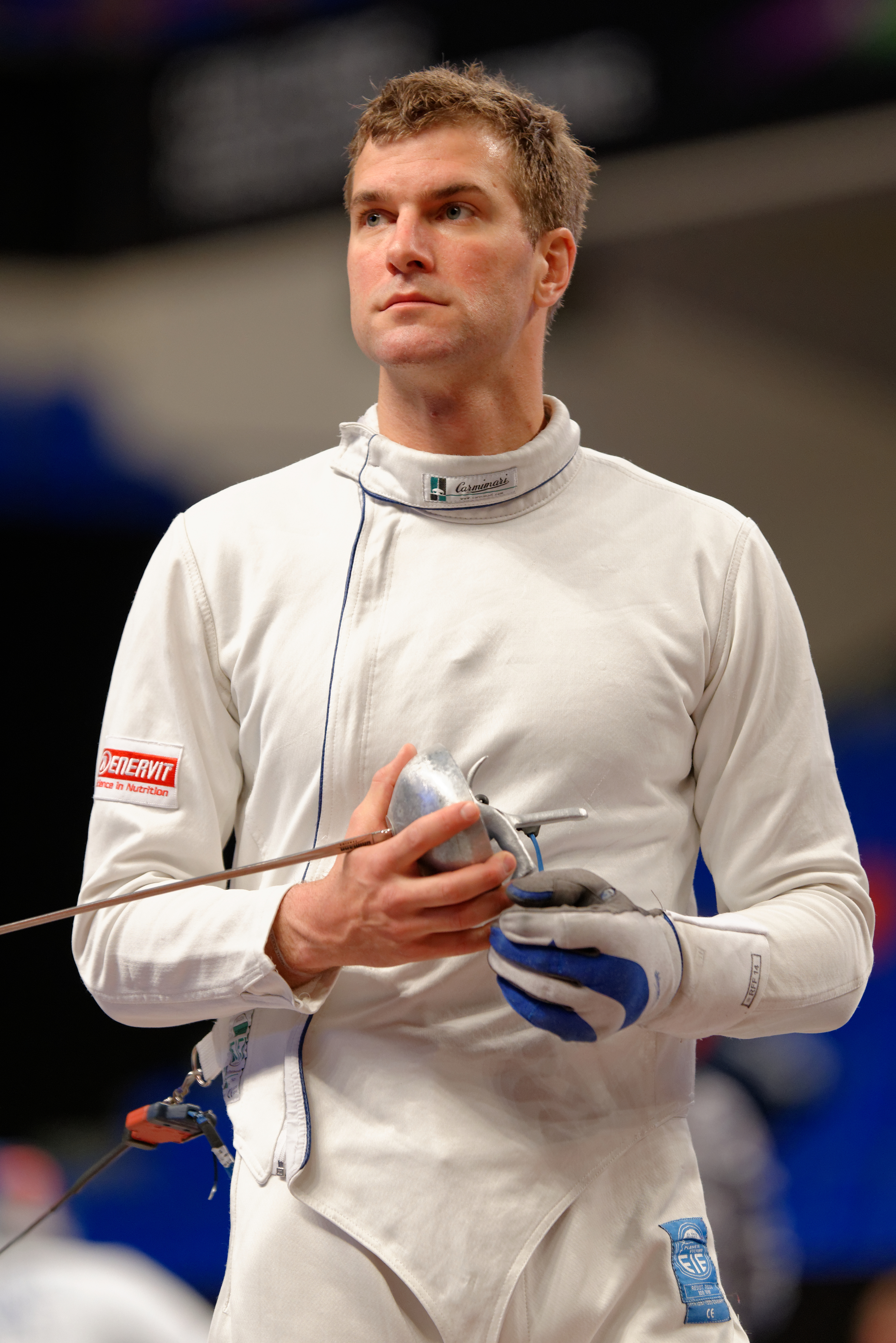
- Steffen at the 2014 Paris World Cup

Personal information
- Full name: Benjamin Thomas Steffen
- Nickname: Beni
- Born: 8 March 1982 (age 44) Basel, Switzerland
- Height: 1.89 m (6 ft 2 in)
- Weight: 83 kg (183 lb)

Fencing career
- Sport: Fencing
- Country: Switzerland
- Weapon: Épée
- Hand: left-handed
- National coach: Gianni Muzio
- Club: Fechtgesellschaft Basel
- Head coach: Manfred Beckmann
- Former coach: Angelo Mazzoni
- FIE ranking: current ranking
Medal record
World Championships
Gold medal – first place	2018 Wuxi	Team
Silver medal – second place	2017 Leipzig	Team
Bronze medal – third place	2011 Catania	Team
Bronze medal – third place	2014 Kazan	Team
Bronze medal – third place	2015 Moscow	Team
Bronze medal – third place	2019 Budapest	Team
European Championships
Gold medal – first place	2004 Copenhagen	Team
Gold medal – first place	2012 Legnano	Team
Gold medal – first place	2013 Zagreb	Team
Gold medal – first place	2014 Strasbourg	Team
Silver medal – second place	2009 Plovdiv	Team

Benjamin Thomas Steffen (born 8 March 1982) is a Swiss left-handed épée fencer, three-time team European champion, 2018 team world champion, and 2016 Olympian.

Between 2006 and 2016, Steffen won two silver medals and two bronze medals at FIE Men's Épée Grands Prix.

Between 2007 and 2009, Steffen won one silver medal and two bronze medals at FIE Men's Épée World Cups.

Steffen began fencing at the age of 7 on his brother Andreas' suggestion. His sister Tabea is also an épée fencer.

== Medal Record ==
=== World Championship ===
Year	Location	Event	Position
2011	Catania, Italy	Team Men's Épée	3rd
2014	Kazan, Russia	Team Men's Épée	3rd
2015	Moscow, Russia	Team Men's Épée	3rd
2017	Leipzig, Germany	Team Men's Épée	2nd
2018	Wuxi, China	Team Men's Épée	1st
2019	Budapest, Hungary	Team Men's Épée	3rd

=== European Championship ===
Year	Location	Event	Position
2009	Plovdiv, Bulgaria	Team Men's Épée	2nd
2012	Legnano, Italy	Team Men's Épée	1st
2013	Zagreb, Croatia	Team Men's Épée	1st
2014	Strasbourg, France	Team Men's Épée	1st
2015	Montreux, Switzerland	Team Men's Épée	3rd

=== Grand Prix ===
Date	Location	Event	Position
2006-03-10	Stockholm, Sweden	Individual Men's Épée	2nd
2008-03-07	Stockholm, Sweden	Individual Men's Épée	3rd
2015-03-20	Budapest, Hungary	Individual Men's Épée	3rd
2016-04-22	Rio de Janeiro, Brazil	Individual Men's Épée	2nd

=== World Cup ===
Date	Location	Event	Position
2005-05-06	Legnano, Italy	Individual Men's Épée	3rd
2006-06-03	Lisbon, Portugal	Individual Men's Épée	3rd
2007-06-08	Caguas, Puerto Rico	Individual Men's Épée	2nd
2009-02-07	Lisbon, Portugal	Individual Men's Épée	3rd
