= Nikita Glazkov =

Russian Olympic épée fencer

Personal information
- Full name: Nikita Yuryevich Glazkov
- Nationality: (Russia) Russian
- Born: 16 April 1992 (age 34) Moscow, Russia
- Home town: Moscow, Russia

Fencing career
- Sport: Fencing
- Country: Russia
- Weapon: Épée
- Hand: left
- Club: MGFSO, Moscow, Russia
- FIE ranking: current ranking

Nikita Yuryevich Glazkov (Russian: Никита Юрьевич Глазков, IPA: [nʲɪˈkʲitə ɡɫɐˈskof], born 16 April 1992 in Moscow) is a Russian left-handed épée fencer, three-time team European champion, and 2021 team Olympic silver medalist.

Glazkov competed in fencing at the junior level, and was part of the winning team in team épée at the 2011 Summer Universiade in Shenchzhen. Since 2021, he fenced at professional level. In 2014, Glazkov was included to the Russian national team. His coaches are Nikolay Tokarenko and Ildar Kamaletdinov.

Glazkov is a bronze medalist in team épée at the 2017 World Fencing Championships and a 2019 European Champion, also in team épée.

== Medal Record ==
=== Olympic Games ===
Year	Location	Event	Position
2021	Tokyo, Japan	Team Men's Épée	2nd

=== World Championship ===
Year	Location	Event	Position
2017	Leipzig, Germany	Team Men's Épée	3rd
2018	Wuxi, China	Team Men's Épée	3rd

=== European Championship ===
Year	Location	Event	Position
2017	(Georgia (country)) Tbilisi, Georgia	Team Men's Épée	1st
2018	Novi Sad, Serbia	Team Men's Épée	1st
2019	Düsseldorf, Germany	Team Men's Épée	1st

=== World Cup ===
Date	Location	Event	Position
10/28/2016	Bern, Switzerland	Individual Men's Épée	1st
05/17/2019	Paris, France	Individual Men's Épée	2nd
