= Michele Niggeler =

Swiss épée fencer (born 1992)

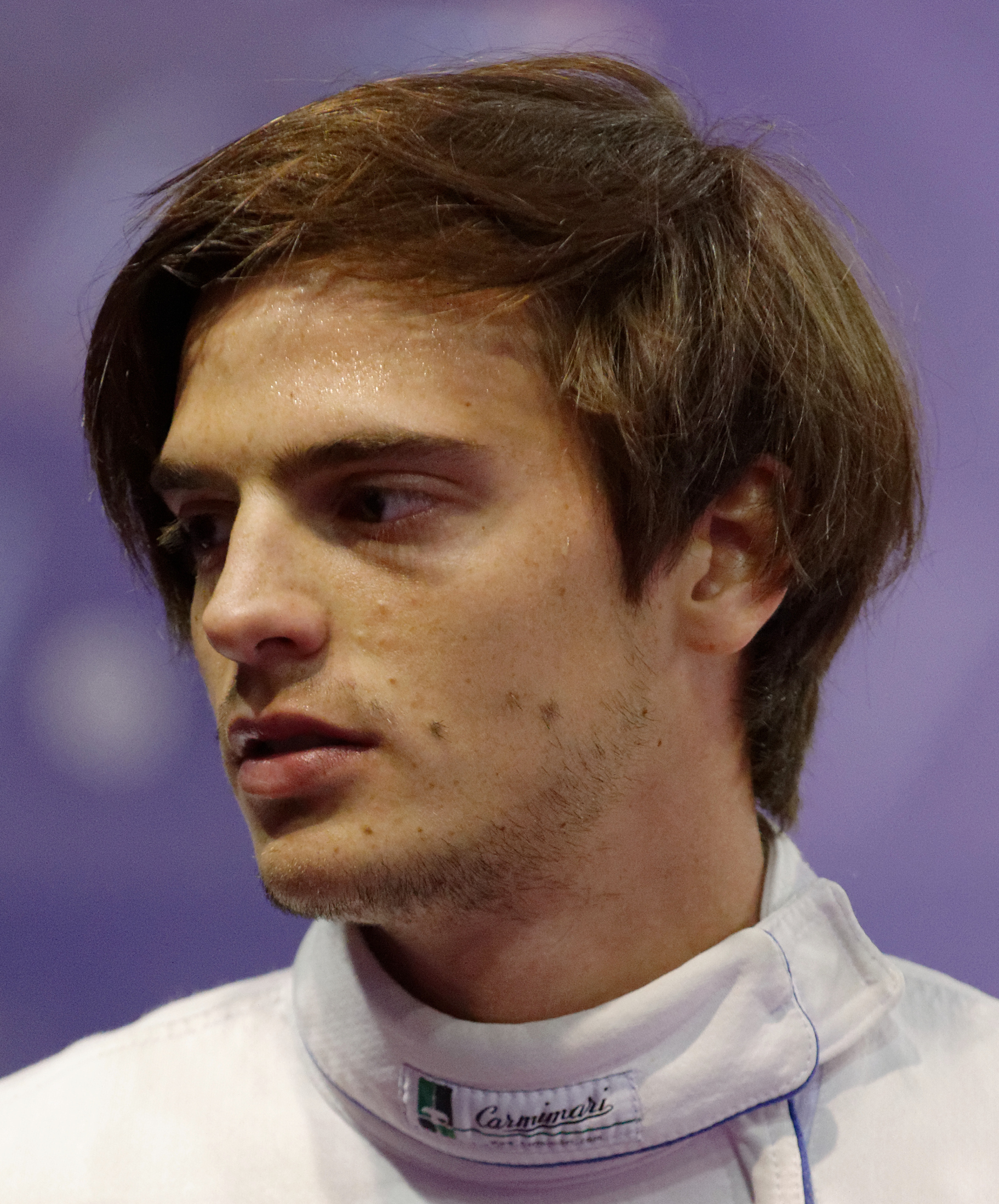

Personal information
- Born: 10 March 1992 (age 34)
- Height: 1.80 m (5 ft 11 in)
- Weight: 65 kg (143 lb)

Fencing career
- Sport: Fencing
- Country: Switzerland
- Weapon: Épée
- Hand: right-handed
- Club: Real Madrid
- FIE ranking: current ranking
Medal record
World Championships
Bronze medal – third place	2019 Budapest	Team

Michele Niggeler (born 10 March 1992) is a Swiss épée fencer. He has dual nationality, Swiss and Italian, but he competed in the Épée for Switzerland. His club is Lugano Scherma.

He participated at the 2019 World Fencing Championships, winning a medal. He also competed in the 2020 Summer Olympics in Tokyo, but was defeated in the first round.
