= Max Heinzer =

Swiss fencer (born 1987)

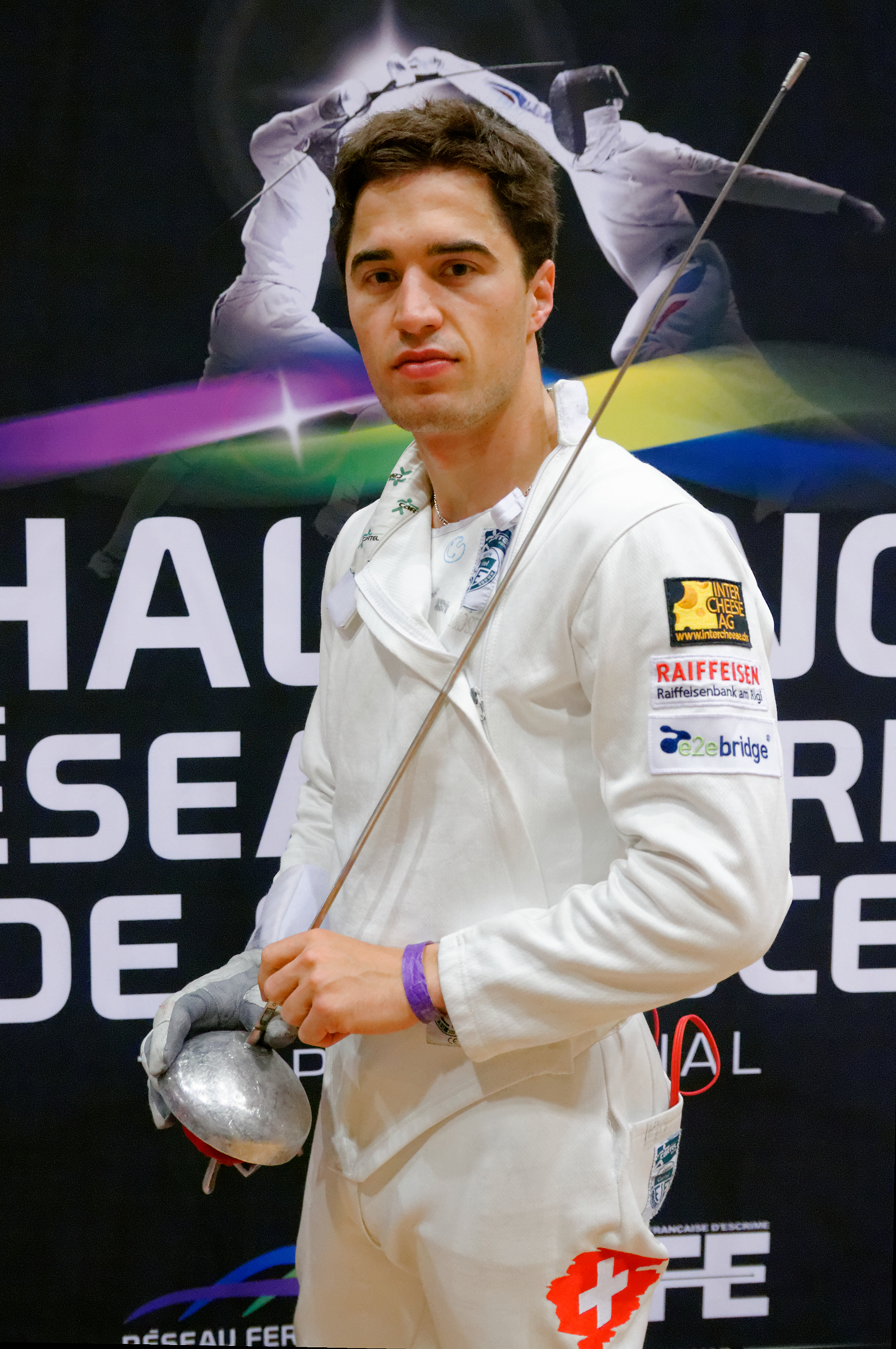
- Heinzer at the 2013 Challenge RFF-Trophée Monal

Personal information
- Born: 8 August 1987 (age 39) Lucerne, Switzerland
- Height: 1.78 m (5 ft 10 in)
- Weight: 73 kg (161 lb)

Fencing career
- Sport: Fencing
- Country: Switzerland
- Weapon: Épée
- Hand: right-handed
- FIE ranking: current ranking
Medal record
World Championships
Gold medal – first place	2018 Wuxi	Team
Silver medal – second place	2017 Leipzig	Team
Bronze medal – third place	2014 Kazan	Team
Bronze medal – third place	2015 Moscow	Team
Bronze medal – third place	2019 Budapest	Team
European Games
Silver medal – second place	2023 Kraków–Małopolska	Team
European Championships
Gold medal – first place	2012 Legnano	Team
Gold medal – first place	2013 Zagreb	Team
Gold medal – first place	2014 Strasbourg	Team
Silver medal – second place	2009 Plovdiv	Team
Silver medal – second place	2015 Montreux	Individual
Silver medal – second place	2016 Toruń	Individual
Silver medal – second place	2023 Kraków	Team
Bronze medal – third place	2011 Sheffield	Individual
Bronze medal – third place	2012 Legnano	Individual
Bronze medal – third place	2014 Strasbourg	Individual
Bronze medal – third place	2015 Montreux	Team
Bronze medal – third place	2022 Antalya	Individual

Max Heinzer (born 8 August 1987) is a Swiss right-handed épée fencer, three-time team European champion, 2018 team world champion, and three-time Olympian.

Heinzer competed in the 2012 London Olympic Games, the 2016 Rio de Janeiro Olympic Games, and the 2020 Tokyo Olympic Games.

He began fencing at the age of 5 when his older brother Michael introduced him to fencing.

== Medal record ==
=== World Championship ===
Year	Location	Event	Position
2011	Catania, Italy	Team Men's Épée	3rd
2014	Kazan, Russia	Team Men's Épée	3rd
2015	Moscow, Russia	Team Men's Épée	3rd
2017	Leipzig, Germany	Team Men's Épée	2nd
2018	Wuxi, China	Team Men's Épée	1st
2019	Budapest, Hungary	Team Men's Épée	3rd

=== European Championship ===
Year	Location	Event	Position
2009	Plovdiv, Bulgaria	Team Men's Épée	2nd
2011	Sheffield, United Kingdom	Individual Men's Épée	3rd
2012	Legnano, Italy	Individual Men's Épée	3rd
2012	Legnano, Italy	Team Men's Épée	1st
2013	Zagreb, Croatia	Team Men's Épée	1st
2014	Strasbourg, France	Individual Men's Épée	3rd
2014	Strasbourg, France	Team Men's Épée	1st
2015	Montreux, Switzerland	Individual Men's Épée	2nd
2015	Montreux, Switzerland	Team Men's Épée	3rd
2016	Toruń, Poland	Individual Men's Épée	2nd
2022	Antalya, Turkey	Individual Men's Épée	3rd

=== Grand Prix ===
Date	Location	Event	Position
2011-06-04	Bern, Switzerland	Individual Men's Épée	1st
2012-06-02	Bern, Switzerland	Individual Men's Épée	1st
2013-05-11	Bern, Switzerland	Individual Men's Épée	1st
2015-05-22	Rio de Janeiro, Brazil	Individual Men's Épée	2nd
2018-03-23	Budapest, Hungary	Individual Men's Épée	1st
2019-03-08	Budapest, Hungary	Individual Men's Épée	3rd

=== World Cup ===
Date	Location	Event	Position
2009-06-20	Buenos Aires, Argentina	Individual Men's Épée	2nd
2010-02-06	Lisbon, Portugal	Individual Men's Épée	1st
2010-06-04	Caguas, Puerto Rico	Individual Men's Épée	3rd
2012-06-29	Buenos Aires, Argentina	Individual Men's Épée	2nd
2013-01-25	Legnano, Italy	Individual Men's Épée	1st
2013-03-15	Tallinn, Estonia	Individual Men's Épée	1st
2014-02-21	Tallinn, Estonia	Individual Men's Épée	1st
2015-01-22	Heidenheim, Germany	Individual Men's Épée	1st
2017-02-17	Vancouver, Canada	Individual Men's Épée	1st
2017-11-17	Legnano, Italy	Individual Men's Épée	3rd

Olympic Games
Preceded by Giulia Steingruber	Flagbearer for Switzerland (with Mujinga Kambundji); Tokyo 2020	Succeeded by Incumbent
