= Men's épée at the 2015 World Fencing Championships =

The Men's épée event of the 2015 World Fencing Championships was held on 15 July 2015. The qualification was held on 14 July 2015.

== Medalists ==
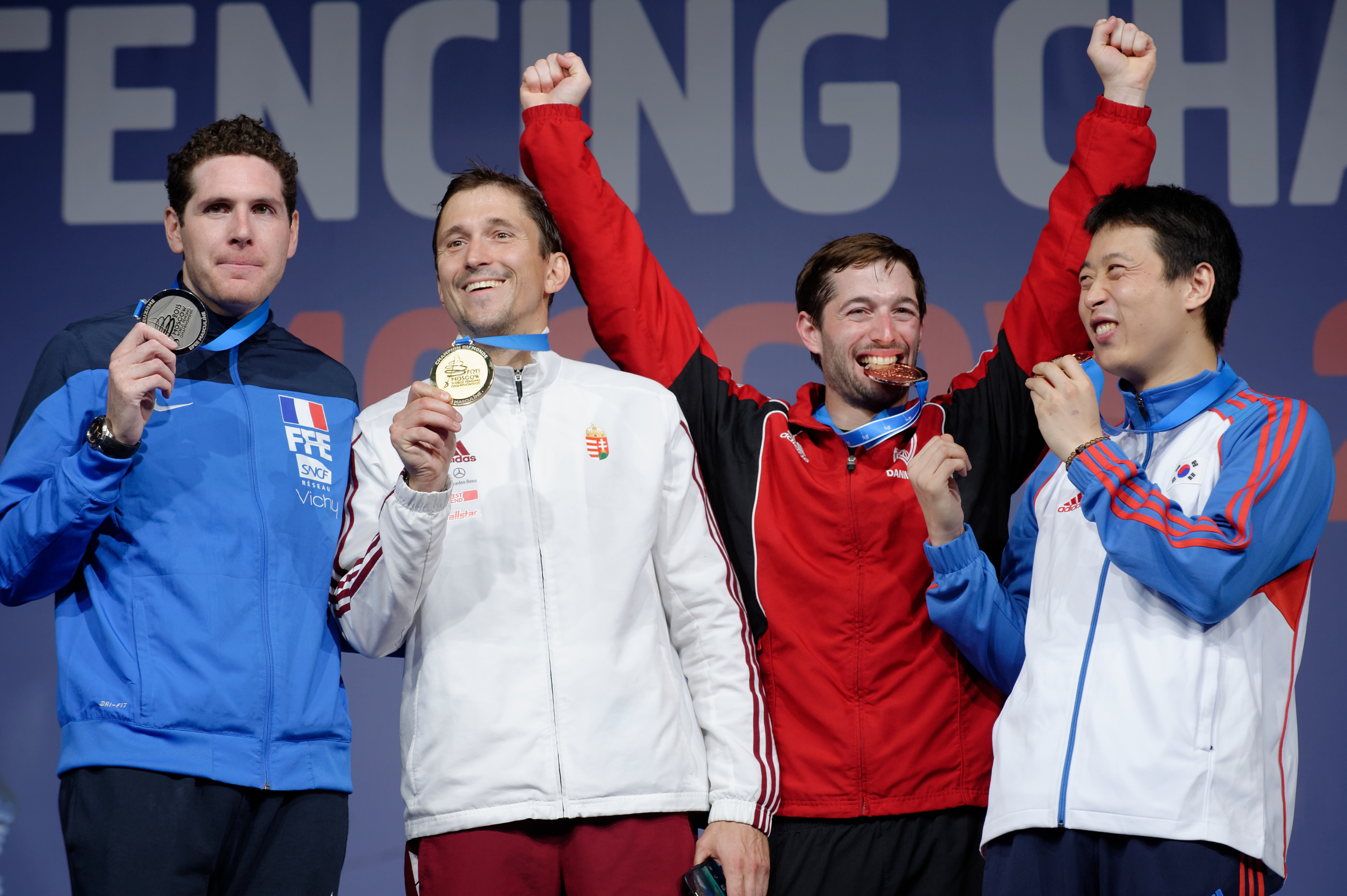
From left to right, Gauthier Grumier, Géza Imre, Patrick Jørgensen and Jung Seung-hwa

Gold	(Hungary) Géza Imre
Silver	(France) Gauthier Grumier
Bronze	(South Korea) Jung Seung-hwa
Bronze	(Denmark) Patrick Jørgensen

== Draw ==
=== Finals ===
Semi-finals
(South Korea) Jung Seung-hwa	8
(Hungary) Géza Imre	15
(Denmark) Patrick Jørgensen	11
(France) Gauthier Grumier	15

Final
(Hungary) Géza Imre	15
(France) Gauthier Grumier	14

=== Top half ===
==== Section 1 ====
Round of 64
1	(Italy) Enrico Garozzo	15
64	(China) Zhang Chengjie	12
33	(Ukraine) Anatoliy Herey	15
32	(Finland) Niko Vuorinen	12
17	(Germany) Jörg Fiedler	13
48	(Portugal) João Cordeiro	15
49	(South Korea) Kweon Young-jun	12
16	(Japan) Kazuyasu Minobe	9
9	(France) Daniel Jerent	15
56	(Brazil) Nicolas Ferreira	9
41	(China) Li Guojie	12
24	(China) Jiao Yunlong	15
25	(Germany) Stephan Rein	8
40	(South Korea) Jung Seung-hwa	15
57	(Colombia) Jhon Édison Rodríguez	15
8	(Czech Republic) Pavel Pitra	6

Round of 32
1	(Italy) Enrico Garozzo	15
33	(Ukraine) Anatoliy Herey	7
48	(Portugal) João Cordeiro	6
49	(South Korea) Kweon Young-jun	9
9	(France) Daniel Jerent	10
24	(China) Jiao Yunlong	15
40	(South Korea) Jung Seung-hwa	15
57	(Colombia) Jhon Édison Rodríguez	6

Round of 16
1	(Italy) Enrico Garozzo	15
49	(South Korea) Kweon Young-jun	10
24	(China) Jiao Yunlong	9
40	(South Korea) Jung Seung-hwa	15

Quarterfinals
1	(Italy) Enrico Garozzo	9
40	(South Korea) Jung Seung-hwa	15

==== Section 2 ====
Round of 64
5	(Russia) Anton Avdeev	13
60	(China) Li Zhen	15
37	(United States) Yeisser Ramirez	10
28	(Uzbekistan) Oleg Sokolov	15
21	(Italy) Marco Fichera	15
44	(Belarus) Dzianis Paulouski	7
53	(Hungary) Péter Somfai	12
12	(Italy) Paolo Pizzo	15
13	(Ukraine) Bohdan Nikishyn	13
52	(Spain) Yulen Pereira	10
45	(Ukraine) Dmytro Karyuchenko	9
20	(Spain) Miguel Moratilla	15
29	(Switzerland) Peer Borsky	8
36	(Hungary) Géza Imre	15
61	(Cuba) Ringo Quintero Álvarez	8
4	(South Korea) Park Kyoung-doo	15

Round of 32
60	(China) Li Zhen	15
28	(Uzbekistan) Oleg Sokolov	13
21	(Italy) Marco Fichera	15
12	(Italy) Paolo Pizzo	12
13	(Ukraine) Bohdan Nikishyn	6
20	(Spain) Miguel Moratilla	5
36	(Hungary) Géza Imre	15
4	(South Korea) Park Kyoung-doo	10

Round of 16
60	(China) Li Zhen	15
21	(Italy) Marco Fichera	7
13	(Ukraine) Bohdan Nikishyn	14
36	(Hungary) Géza Imre	15

Quarterfinals
60	(China) Li Zhen	8
36	(Hungary) Géza Imre	15

=== Bottom half ===
==== Section 3 ====
Round of 64
3	(Switzerland) Max Heinzer	15
62	(United States) Jason Pryor	14
35	(Uzbekistan) Ruslan Kudayev	15
30	(Spain) José Luis Abajo	12
19	(Italy) Andrea Santarelli	15
46	(Egypt) Mohannad Saif	14
51	(Venezuela) Silvio Fernández	15
14	(Estonia) Nikolai Novosjolov	7
11	(Switzerland) Fabian Kauter	12
54	(Norway) Bartosz Piasecki	15
42	(Kazakhstan) Dmitriy Alexanin	6
22	(Estonia) Sten Priinits	15
27	(Czech Republic) Martin Capek	14
38	(Denmark) Patrick Jørgensen	15
59	(Venezuela) Francisco Limardo	11
6	(Hungary) Gábor Boczkó	15

Round of 32
3	(Switzerland) Max Heinzer	15
35	(Uzbekistan) Ruslan Kudayev	7
19	(Italy) Andrea Santarelli	12
51	(Venezuela) Silvio Fernández	11
54	(Norway) Bartosz Piasecki	11
22	(Estonia) Sten Priinits	10
38	(Denmark) Patrick Jørgensen	15
6	(Hungary) Gábor Boczkó	11

Round of 16
3	(Switzerland) Max Heinzer	12
19	(Italy) Andrea Santarelli	15
54	(Norway) Bartosz Piasecki	13
38	(Denmark) Patrick Jørgensen	15

Quarterfinals
19	(Italy) Andrea Santarelli	14
38	(Denmark) Patrick Jørgensen	15

==== Section 4 ====
Round of 64
7	(France) Ronan Gustin	15
58	(Cuba) Reynier Henríquez Ortiz	14
39	(Hungary) András Rédli	15
26	(Singapore) Samson Mun Hou Lee	12
23	(Egypt) Ayman Mohamed Fayez	4
42	(Venezuela) Rubén Limardo	13
55	(Japan) Keisuke Sakamoto	15
10	(Russia) Pavel Sukhov	13
15	(Switzerland) Benjamin Steffen	14
50	(Poland) Krzysztof Mikołajczak	10
47	(Kazakhstan) Ivan Deryabin	8
18	(Israel) Ido Herpe	15
31	(Finland) Alexander Lahtinen	11
34	(United States) Benjamin Bratton	15
63	(Kazakhstan) Elmir Alimzhanov	11
2	(France) Gauthier Grumier	15

Round of 32
7	(France) Ronan Gustin	15
39	(Hungary) András Rédli	9
42	(Venezuela) Rubén Limardo	10
55	(Japan) Keisuke Sakamoto	5
15	(Switzerland) Benjamin Steffen	11
18	(Israel) Ido Herpe	15
34	(United States) Benjamin Bratton	7
2	(France) Gauthier Grumier	15

Round of 16
7	(France) Ronan Gustin	13
42	(Venezuela) Rubén Limardo	15
18	(Israel) Ido Herpe	11
2	(France) Gauthier Grumier	15

Quarterfinals
42	(Venezuela) Rubén Limardo	8
2	(France) Gauthier Grumier	9
