= Fencing at the 2010 Asian Games – Men's team épée =

Men's team épée at the 2010 Asian Games
- Venue: Guangda Gymnasium
- Date: 21 November 2010
- Competitors: 52 from 14 nations

Medalists
gold medal	South Korea; Jung Jin-sun, Jung Seung-hwa, Kim Won-jin, Park Kyoung-doo
silver medal	Kazakhstan; Elmir Alimzhanov, Alexandr Axenov, Dmitriy Gryaznov, Sergey Shabalin
bronze medal	China; Dong Chao, Li Guojie, Wang Sen, Yin Lianchi
bronze medal	Japan; Kazuyasu Minobe, Shogo Nishida, Keisuke Sakamoto

The men's team épée competition at the 2010 Asian Games in Guangzhou was held on 21 November at the Guangda Gymnasium.

== Schedule ==
All times are China Standard Time (UTC+08:00)

Date	Time	Event
Sunday, 21 November 2010	11:30	Round of 16
Sunday, 21 November 2010	16:40	Quarterfinals
Sunday, 21 November 2010	18:40	Semifinals
Sunday, 21 November 2010	20:00	Gold medal match

== Seeding ==
The teams were seeded taking into account the results achieved by competitors representing each team in the individual event.

Rank	Team	Fencer		Total
Rank	Team	1	2	Total
1	China (CHN)	2	3	5
2	South Korea (KOR)	1	6	7
3	Japan (JPN)	3	7	10
4	Kazakhstan (KAZ)	5	17	22
5	Kyrgyzstan (KGZ)	11	13	24
6	Uzbekistan (UZB)	8	19	27
7	Athletes from Kuwait (IOC)	14	18	32
8	Hong Kong (HKG)	10	25	35
9	Saudi Arabia (KSA)	12	27	39
10	Iran (IRI)	15	24	39
11	Vietnam (VIE)	16	28	44
12	Qatar (QAT)	23	26	49
13	India (IND)	22	30	52
14	United Arab Emirates (UAE)	31	—	63

== Results ==
Legend

- WO — Won by walkover

Round of 16
9	Saudi Arabia	33
8	Hong Kong	45
5	Kyrgyzstan	45
12	Qatar	23
13	India	35
4	Kazakhstan	45
3	Japan	45
14	United Arab Emirates	10
11	Vietnam
6	Uzbekistan	WO
7	Athletes from Kuwait	45
10	Iran	40

Quarterfinals
1	China	45
8	Hong Kong	20
5	Kyrgyzstan	42
4	Kazakhstan	45
3	Japan	45
6	Uzbekistan	41
7	Athletes from Kuwait	32
2	South Korea	45

Semifinals
1	China	40
4	Kazakhstan	45
3	Japan	37
2	South Korea	45

Gold medal match
4	Kazakhstan	31
2	South Korea	45

== Final standing ==
Rank	Team
1st place, gold medalist(s)	South Korea (KOR); Jung Jin-sun; Jung Seung-hwa; Kim Won-jin; Park Kyoung-doo
2nd place, silver medalist(s)	Kazakhstan (KAZ); Elmir Alimzhanov; Alexandr Axenov; Dmitriy Gryaznov; Sergey Shabalin
3rd place, bronze medalist(s)	China (CHN); Dong Chao; Li Guojie; Wang Sen; Yin Lianchi
3rd place, bronze medalist(s)	Japan (JPN); Kazuyasu Minobe; Shogo Nishida; Keisuke Sakamoto
5	Kyrgyzstan (KGZ); Aleksandr Chernykh; Mikhail Ivanov; Serguei Katchiourine; Denis Nikitin
6	Uzbekistan (UZB); Roman Aleksandrov; Alexandr Filinov; Bakhtiyorjon Ganiev; Ruslan Kudayev
7	Athletes from Kuwait (IOC); Qaisar Al-Zamel; Faisal Ashkanani; Hussain Kamal; Fahad Malallah
8	Hong Kong (HKG); Lau Kam Tan; Leung Ka Ming; Tsui Yiu Chung; Wu Siu Cheung
9	Saudi Arabia (KSA); Meshari Al-Bashir; Juma Al-Khaldi; Nasser Al-Omairi; Talal Al-Shammari
10	Iran (IRI); Sadegh Abedi; Mohammad Rezaei; Hamed Sedaghati; Ali Yaghoubian
11	Vietnam (VIE); Bùi Văn Thái; Đỗ Hữu Cường; Nguyễn Tiến Nhật
12	Qatar (QAT); Abdulaziz Al-Amoodi; Fahad Al-Yami; Abdullah Ebrahimi; Mohammed Mirzaei
13	India (IND); Amardeep Basediya; Ajinkya Dudhare; Shagolsem Jayanta Singh
14	United Arab Emirates (UAE); Abdullah Al-Hammadi; Ali Al-Mansoori; Majed Al-Mansoori
