= Fencing at the 2014 Asian Games – Men's team épée =

Men's team épée at the 2014 Asian Games
- Venue: Goyang Gymnasium
- Date: 23 September 2014
- Competitors: 61 from 16 nations

Medalists
gold medal	South Korea; Jung Jin-sun, Kweon Young-jun, Park Kyoung-doo, Park Sang-young
silver medal	Japan; Kazuyasu Minobe, Keisuke Sakamoto, Masaru Yamada
bronze medal	Vietnam; Nguyễn Phước Đến, Nguyễn Tiến Nhật, Phạm Hùng Dương, Trương Trần Nhật Minh
bronze medal	Kazakhstan; Dmitriy Alexanin, Elmir Alimzhanov, Dmitriy Gryaznov, Ruslan Kurbanov

The men's team épée competition at the 2014 Asian Games in Goyang was held on 23 September at the Goyang Gymnasium.

== Schedule ==
All times are Korea Standard Time (UTC+09:00)

Date	Time	Event
Tuesday, 23 September 2014	11:00	Round of 16
Tuesday, 23 September 2014	13:30	Quarterfinals
Tuesday, 23 September 2014	15:00	Semifinals
Tuesday, 23 September 2014	19:00	Gold medal match

== Seeding ==
The teams were seeded taking into account the results achieved by competitors representing each team in the individual event.

Rank	Team	Fencer		Total
Rank	Team	1	2	Total
1	South Korea (KOR)	1	2	3
2	Kazakhstan (KAZ)	7	9	16
3	Japan (JPN)	8	13	21
3	Vietnam (VIE)	3	18	21
5	Singapore (SIN)	3	19	22
6	Hong Kong (HKG)	6	17	23
7	China (CHN)	12	14	26
7	Uzbekistan (UZB)	10	16	26
9	Kyrgyzstan (KGZ)	5	24	29
10	Saudi Arabia (KSA)	15	22	37
11	Iran (IRI)	11	29	40
12	Kuwait (KUW)	20	27	47
13	Mongolia (MGL)	21	28	49
14	Qatar (QAT)	25	26	51
15	Macau (MAC)	23	30	53
16	Nepal (NEP)	34	35	69

== Results ==
Round of 16
1	South Korea	45
16	Nepal	11
9	Kyrgyzstan	45
8	Uzbekistan	39
5	Singapore	34
12	Kuwait	35
13	Mongolia	24
4	Vietnam	45
3	Japan	45
14	Qatar	25
11	Iran	38
6	Hong Kong	37
7	China	45
10	Saudi Arabia	33
15	Macau	26
2	Kazakhstan	45

Quarterfinals
1	South Korea	43
9	Kyrgyzstan	38
12	Kuwait	38
4	Vietnam	45
3	Japan	45
11	Iran	35
7	China	40
2	Kazakhstan	44

Semifinals
1	South Korea	45
4	Vietnam	25
3	Japan	45
2	Kazakhstan	37

Gold medal match
1	South Korea	25
3	Japan	21

== Final standing ==
Rank	Team
1st place, gold medalist(s)	South Korea (KOR); Jung Jin-sun; Kweon Young-jun; Park Kyoung-doo; Park Sang-young
2nd place, silver medalist(s)	Japan (JPN); Kazuyasu Minobe; Keisuke Sakamoto; Masaru Yamada
3rd place, bronze medalist(s)	Vietnam (VIE); Nguyễn Phước Đến; Nguyễn Tiến Nhật; Phạm Hùng Dương; Trương Trần Nhật Minh
3rd place, bronze medalist(s)	Kazakhstan (KAZ); Dmitriy Alexanin; Elmir Alimzhanov; Dmitriy Gryaznov; Ruslan Kurbanov
5	China (CHN); Dong Chao; Jiao Yunlong; Li Guojie; Zhang Chengjie
6	Kyrgyzstan (KGZ); Aleksandr Chernykh; Mikhail Ivanov; Evgeny Naumkin; Roman Petrov
7	Iran (IRI); Sadegh Abedi; Taher Ashouri; Mohammad Rezaei; Ali Yaghoubian
8	Kuwait (KUW); Faisal Ashkanani; Hussain Kamal; Fahad Malallah; Ahmad Ramadhan
9	Singapore (SIN); Willie Khoo; Samson Lee; Lim Wei Wen
10	Hong Kong (HKG); Fong Kiu; Clarence Lai; Leung Ka Ming; Nicola Lu
11	Uzbekistan (UZB); Roman Aleksandrov; Bakhtiyorjon Ganiev; Igor Knyazev; Ruslan Kudayev
12	Saudi Arabia (KSA); Zakaria Al-Dawood; Muhanna Al-Hamoud; Waleed Al-Muwallad; Nasser Al-Omairi
13	Mongolia (MGL); Bayarsaikhany Batkhüü; Enkhtsogtyn Dölgöön; Enkhbatyn Nyamlkhagva
14	Qatar (QAT); Mohammed Al-Dosari; Abdulrahman Al-Hashemi; Ebrahim Al-Tairi; Mohammed Mirzaei
15	Macau (MAC); Ho Ka Hou; Lam Wai Tat; Leong Ka Hou; Long Jie
16	Nepal (NEP); Janga Giri; Ram Bahadur Shahi; Rajendra Shrestha; Omkar Singh
