= Men's épée at the 2014 World Fencing Championships =

The Men's épée event of the 2014 World Fencing Championships was held on 20 July 2014. A qualification was held on 17 July.

== Medalists ==
Gold	Ulrich Robeiri (FRA)
Silver	Park Kyoung-doo (KOR)
Bronze	Gauthier Grumier (FRA)
Bronze	Enrico Garozzo (ITA)

== Draw ==
=== Finals ===
Semi-finals
(France) Ulrich Robeiri	15
(France) Gauthier Grumier	11
(South Korea) Park Kyoung-doo	15
(Italy) Enrico Garozzo	10

Final
(France) Ulrich Robeiri	15
(South Korea) Park Kyoung-doo	12

=== Top half ===
==== Section 1 ====
Round of 64
1	(Estonia) Nikolai Novosjolov	8
64	(Finland) Niko Vuorinen	15
33	(Venezuela) Kelvin Cañas	14
32	(Kyrgyzstan) Roman Petrov	15
17	(Kazakhstan) Ruslan Kurbanov	15
48	(Hungary) Péter Szényi	10
49	(China) Dong Chao	12
16	(Russia) Anton Avdeev	15
9	(France) Ulrich Robeiri	15
56	(Portugal) Pedro Arêde	10
41	(Ukraine) Maksym Khvorost	13
24	(Japan) Kazuyasu Minobe	15
25	(Egypt) Ayman Fayez	7
40	(Netherlands) Bas Verwijlen	15
57	(Argentina) Jesús Lugonés	5
8	(Switzerland) Max Heinzer	15

Round of 32
64	(Finland) Niko Vuorinen	15
32	(Kyrgyzstan) Roman Petrov	6
17	(Kazakhstan) Ruslan Kurbanov	8
16	(Russia) Anton Avdeev	15
9	(France) Ulrich Robeiri	15
24	(Japan) Kazuyasu Minobe	7
40	(Netherlands) Bas Verwijlen	13
8	(Switzerland) Max Heinzer	15

Round of 16
64	(Finland) Niko Vuorinen	11
16	(Russia) Anton Avdeev	15
9	(France) Ulrich Robeiri	15
8	(Switzerland) Max Heinzer	8

Quarterfinals
16	(Russia) Anton Avdeev	13
9	(France) Ulrich Robeiri	14

==== Section 2 ====
Round of 64
5	(Russia) Pavel Sukhov	15
60	(Egypt) Mohannad Saif	7
37	(Kazakhstan) Dmitriy Gryaznov	12
28	(Venezuela) Francisco Limardo	15
21	(Czech Republic) Pavel Pitra	15
44	(Hungary) Gábor Boczkó	14
53	(United States) Jimmy Moody	8
12	(Venezuela) Silvio Fernández	13
13	(France) Gauthier Grumier	15
52	(Israel) Grigori Beskin	9
45	(Denmark) Frederik von der Osten	13
20	(Israel) Ido Herpe	15
29	(Germany) Falk Spautz	12
36	(Ukraine) Anatoliy Herey	15
61	(Ukraine) Igor Reizlin	14
4	(South Korea) Park Sang-young	15

Round of 32
5	(Russia) Pavel Sukhov	15
28	(Venezuela) Francisco Limardo	11
21	(Czech Republic) Pavel Pitra	11
12	(Venezuela) Silvio Fernández	15
13	(France) Gauthier Grumier	15
20	(Israel) Ido Herpe	10
36	(Ukraine) Anatoliy Herey	11
4	(South Korea) Park Sang-young	15

Round of 16
5	(Russia) Pavel Sukhov	15
12	(Venezuela) Silvio Fernández	14
13	(France) Gauthier Grumier	15
4	(South Korea) Park Sang-young	5

Quarterfinals
5	(Russia) Pavel Sukhov	7
13	(France) Gauthier Grumier	15

=== Bottom half ===
==== Section 3 ====
Round of 64
3	(Hungary) András Rédli	14
62	(Israel) Yuval Freilich	10
35	(Canada) Hugues Boisvert-Simard	15
30	(Czech Republic) Jiří Beran	12
19	(Japan) Masaru Yamada	10
46	(South Korea) Park Kyoung-doo	14
51	(Switzerland) Benjamin Steffen	15
14	(Poland) Radosław Zawrotniak	14
11	(France) Jean-Michel Lucenay	14
54	(Italy) Paolo Pizzo	15
43	(Slovenia) Jan Bidovec	14
22	(Spain) José Luis Abajo	15
27	(Kazakhstan) Elmir Alimzhanov	15
38	(Uzbekistan) Aleksey Tishko	12
59	(Cuba) Fidel Ferret Ferrer	10
6	(Ukraine) Bohdan Nikishyn	15

Round of 32
3	(Hungary) András Rédli	15
35	(Canada) Hugues Boisvert-Simard	10
46	(South Korea) Park Kyoung-doo	15
51	(Switzerland) Benjamin Steffen	11
54	(Italy) Paolo Pizzo	15
22	(Spain) José Luis Abajo	9
27	(Kazakhstan) Elmir Alimzhanov	14
6	(Ukraine) Bohdan Nikishyn	15

Round of 16
3	(Hungary) András Rédli	3
46	(South Korea) Park Kyoung-doo	4
54	(Italy) Paolo Pizzo	8
6	(Ukraine) Bohdan Nikishyn	15

Quarterfinals
46	(South Korea) Park Kyoung-doo	15
6	(Ukraine) Bohdan Nikishyn	13

==== Section 4 ====
Round of 64
7	(Italy) Enrico Garozzo	12
58	(Germany) Norman Ackermann	8
39	(Russia) Sergey Khodos	13
26	(Venezuela) José Escobar	12
23	(Hungary) Péter Somfai	14
42	(China) Zhang Chengjie	15
55	(Estonia) Marno Allika	11
10	(South Korea) Jung Jin-sun	15
15	(Germany) Jörg Fiedler	15
50	(South Korea) Kweon Young-jun	14
47	(Denmark) Patrick Jørgensen	7
18	(Estonia) Sten Priinits	15
31	(Italy) Lorenzo Bruttini	11
34	(Uzbekistan) Ruslan Kudayev	15
63	(Spain) Pau Roselló	14
2	(Switzerland) Fabian Kauter	15

Round of 32
7	(Italy) Enrico Garozzo	15
39	(Russia) Sergey Khodos	12
42	(China) Zhang Chengjie	13
10	(South Korea) Jung Jin-sun	15
15	(Germany) Jörg Fiedler	14
18	(Estonia) Sten Priinits	15
34	(Uzbekistan) Ruslan Kudayev	11
2	(Switzerland) Fabian Kauter	15

Round of 16
7	(Italy) Enrico Garozzo	14
10	(South Korea) Jung Jin-sun	13
18	(Estonia) Sten Priinits	15
2	(Switzerland) Fabian Kauter	14

Quarterfinals
7	(Italy) Enrico Garozzo	15
18	(Estonia) Sten Priinits	9

== Final classification ==
Rank	Athlete	Nation
1st place, gold medalist(s)	Ulrich Robeiri	France
2nd place, silver medalist(s)	Park Kyoung-doo	South Korea
3rd place, bronze medalist(s)	Enrico Garozzo	Italy
3rd place, bronze medalist(s)	Gauthier Grumier	France
5	Bohdan Nikishyn	Ukraine
6	Pavel Sukhov	Russia
7	Anton Avdeev	Russia
8	Sten Priinits	Estonia
9	Fabian Kauter	Switzerland
10	Park Sang-young	South Korea
11	András Rédli	Hungary
12	Max Heinzer	Switzerland
13	Jung Jin-sun	South Korea
14	Silvio Fernández	Venezuela
15	Paolo Pizzo	Italy
16	Niko Vuorinen	Finland
17	Jörg Fiedler	Germany
18	Ruslan Korbanov	Kazakhstan
19	Ido Herpe	Israel
20	Pavel Pitra	Czech Republic
21	José Luis Abajo	Spain
22	Minobe Kazuyasu	Japan
23	Elmir Alimzhanov	Russia
24	Francisco Limardo	Venezuela
25	Roman Petrov	Kazakhstan
26	Ruslan Kudayev	Uzbekistan
27	Hughes Boisvert-Simard	Canada
28	Anatoliy Herey	Ukraine
29	Sergey Khodos	Russia
30	Bas Verwijlen	Netherlands
31	Zhang Chengjie	China
32	Benjamin Steffen	Switzerland
33	Nikolai Novosjolov	Estonia
34	Jean-Michel Lucenay	France
35	Radosław Zawrotniak	Poland
36	Yamada Masaru	Japan
37	Péter Somfai	Hungary
38	Ayman Mohamed Fayez	Egypt
39	José P. Escobar	Venezuela
40	Falk Spautz	Germany
41	Jiří Beran	Czech Republic
42	Lorenzo Bruttini	Italy
43	Kelvin Cañas	Venezuela
44	Dmitriy Gryaznov	Kazakhstan
45	Aleksey Tishko	Uzbekistan
46	Maksym Khvorost	Ukraine
47	Jan Bidovec	Slovenia
48	Gábor Boczkó	Hungary
49	Frederik von der Osten	Denmark
50	Patrick Jørgensen	Denmark
51	Péter Szényi	Hungary
52	Dong Chao	China
53	Kweon Young-jun	South Korea
54	Grigori Beskin	Israel
55	Jimmy Moody	United States
56	Marno Allika	Estonia
57	Pedro Arede	Portugal
58	Jesús Andrés Lugones Ruggeri	Argentina
59	Normann Ackermann	Germany
60	Fidel Ferret Ferrer	Cuba
61	Mohannad Saif	Egypt
62	Igor Reizlin	Ukraine
63	Yuval Shalom Freilich	Israel
64	Pau Roselló	Spain
