= Fencing at the 2014 Asian Games – Men's individual épée =

Men's competition

Men's individual épée at the 2014 Asian Games
- Venue: Goyang Gymnasium
- Date: 20 September 2014
- Competitors: 35 from 19 nations

Medalists
gold medal	Jung Jin-sun	South Korea
silver medal	Park Kyoung-doo	South Korea
bronze medal	Nguyễn Tiến Nhật	Vietnam
bronze medal	Lim Wei Wen	Singapore

The men's individual épée competition at the 2014 Asian Games in Goyang was held on 20 September at the Goyang Gymnasium.

== Schedule ==
All times are Korea Standard Time (UTC+09:00)

Date	Time	Event
Saturday, 20 September 2014	10:45	Preliminaries
Saturday, 20 September 2014	13:15	Round of 32
Saturday, 20 September 2014	14:55	Round of 16
Saturday, 20 September 2014	16:15	Quarterfinals
Saturday, 20 September 2014	18:50	Semifinals
Saturday, 20 September 2014	20:10	Gold medal match

== Results ==
=== Preliminaries ===
==== Pool A ====
Athlete	KOR	SIN	KGZ	MAC	KUW	MGL	NEP
Jung Jin-sun (KOR)	—	5–4	5–4	5–4	5–4	5–3	5–0
Samson Lee (SIN)	4–5	—	3–5	3–2	5–4	5–4	4–0
Roman Petrov (KGZ)	4–5	5–3	—	5–1	5–1	5–2	5–1
Ho Ka Hou (MAC)	4–5	2–3	1–5	—	1–5	1–5	5–1
Faisal Ashkanani (KUW)	4–5	4–5	1–5	5–1	—	5–2	5–2
Enkhtsogtyn Dölgöön (MGL)	3–5	4–5	2–5	5–1	2–5	—	5–2
Janga Giri (NEP)	0–5	0–4	1–5	1–5	2–5	2–5	—

==== Pool B ====
Athlete	KOR	VIE	KAZ	IRI	KGZ	QAT	MGL
Park Kyoung-doo (KOR)	—	5–3	2–3	5–0	5–3	4–2	5–1
Nguyễn Tiến Nhật (VIE)	3–5	—	3–5	5–1	5–2	4–5	5–0
Dmitriy Alexanin (KAZ)	3–2	5–3	—	5–2	5–2	5–0	5–2
Ali Yaghoubian (IRI)	0–5	1–5	2–5	—	3–5	4–5	5–0
Mikhail Ivanov (KGZ)	3–5	2–5	2–5	5–3	—	5–3	4–5
Ebrahim Al-Tairi (QAT)	2–4	5–4	0–5	5–4	3–5	—	4–5
Bayarsaikhany Batkhüü (MGL)	1–5	0–5	2–5	0–5	5–4	5–4	—

==== Pool C ====
Athlete	JPN	UZB	HKG	MAC	QAT	KSA	YEM
Kazuyasu Minobe (JPN)	—	4–5	3–5	4–2	5–1	5–0	5–2
Roman Aleksandrov (UZB)	5–4	—	4–3	5–4	5–2	5–1	5–2
Leung Ka Ming (HKG)	5–3	3–4	—	5–2	4–5	5–1	5–3
Long Jie (MAC)	2–4	4–5	2–5	—	5–2	1–2	5–4
Mohammed Mirzaei (QAT)	1–5	2–5	5–4	2–5	—	3–5	5–2
Zakaria Al-Dawood (KSA)	0–5	1–5	1–5	2–1	5–3	—	5–1
Saleh Al-Salehi (YEM)	2–5	2–5	3–5	4–5	2–5	1–5	—

==== Pool D ====
Athlete	JPN	CHN	UZB	SIN	KUW	IRI	PLE
Keisuke Sakamoto (JPN)	—	4–5	4–3	4–5	5–1	5–2	5–0
Zhang Chengjie (CHN)	5–4	—	4–3	5–1	5–4	3–5	5–0
Ruslan Kudayev (UZB)	3–4	3–4	—	3–5	5–0	4–5	5–1
Lim Wei Wen (SIN)	5–4	1–5	5–3	—	4–5	0–5	5–3
Fahad Malallah (KUW)	1–5	4–5	0–5	5–4	—	0–5	5–2
Mohammad Rezaei (IRI)	2–5	5–3	5–4	5–0	5–0	—	5–3
Islam Samir (PLE)	0–5	0–5	1–5	3–5	2–5	3–5	—

==== Pool E ====
Athlete	KAZ	CHN	VIE	HKG	UAE	KSA	NEP
Elmir Alimzhanov (KAZ)	—	5–4	5–4	3–4	5–1	5–3	5–1
Dong Chao (CHN)	4–5	—	2–3	2–1	5–0	5–2	5–1
Nguyễn Phước Đến (VIE)	4–5	3–2	—	3–5	5–2	5–3	5–1
Nicola Lu (HKG)	4–3	1–2	5–3	—	5–1	5–2	5–2
Abdullah Al-Hammadi (UAE)	1–5	0–5	2–5	1–5	—	3–5	5–2
Muhanna Al-Hamoud (KSA)	3–5	2–5	3–5	2–5	5–3	—	5–0
Omkar Singh (NEP)	1–5	1–5	1–5	2–5	2–5	0–5	—

==== Summary ====
Rank	Pool	Athlete	W	L	W/M	TD	TF
1	B	Dmitriy Alexanin (KAZ)	6	0	1.000	+17	28
2	C	Roman Aleksandrov (UZB)	6	0	1.000	+13	29
3	A	Jung Jin-sun (KOR)	6	0	1.000	+11	30
4	A	Roman Petrov (KGZ)	5	1	0.833	+16	29
5	B	Park Kyoung-doo (KOR)	5	1	0.833	+14	26
6	D	Mohammad Rezaei (IRI)	5	1	0.833	+12	27
7	E	Nicola Lu (HKG)	5	1	0.833	+12	25
8	E	Elmir Alimzhanov (KAZ)	5	1	0.833	+11	28
9	D	Zhang Chengjie (CHN)	5	1	0.833	+10	27
10	D	Keisuke Sakamoto (JPN)	4	2	0.667	+11	27
11	C	Kazuyasu Minobe (JPN)	4	2	0.667	+11	26
12	E	Dong Chao (CHN)	4	2	0.667	+11	23
13	C	Leung Ka Ming (HKG)	4	2	0.667	+9	27
14	E	Nguyễn Phước Đến (VIE)	4	2	0.667	+7	25
15	A	Samson Lee (SIN)	4	2	0.667	+4	24
16	B	Nguyễn Tiến Nhật (VIE)	3	3	0.500	+7	25
17	A	Faisal Ashkanani (KUW)	3	3	0.500	+4	24
18	D	Lim Wei Wen (SIN)	3	3	0.500	−5	20
19	C	Zakaria Al-Dawood (KSA)	3	3	0.500	−6	14
20	D	Ruslan Kudayev (UZB)	2	4	0.333	+4	23
21	A	Enkhtsogtyn Dölgöön (MGL)	2	4	0.333	−2	21
22	E	Muhanna Al-Hamoud (KSA)	2	4	0.333	−3	20
23	C	Long Jie (MAC)	2	4	0.333	−3	19
24	B	Mikhail Ivanov (KGZ)	2	4	0.333	−5	21
25	B	Ebrahim Al-Tairi (QAT)	2	4	0.333	−8	19
26	C	Mohammed Mirzaei (QAT)	2	4	0.333	−8	18
27	D	Fahad Malallah (KUW)	2	4	0.333	−11	15
28	B	Bayarsaikhany Batkhüü (MGL)	2	4	0.333	−15	13
29	B	Ali Yaghoubian (IRI)	1	5	0.167	−10	15
30	A	Ho Ka Hou (MAC)	1	5	0.167	−10	14
31	E	Abdullah Al-Hammadi (UAE)	1	5	0.167	−15	12
32	C	Saleh Al-Salehi (YEM)	0	6	0.000	−16	14
33	D	Islam Samir (PLE)	0	6	0.000	−21	9
34	E	Omkar Singh (NEP)	0	6	0.000	−23	7
35	A	Janga Giri (NEP)	0	6	0.000	−23	6

=== Knockout round ===
==== Final ====
Gold medal match
5	Park Kyoung-doo (KOR)	9
3	Jung Jin-sun (KOR)	15

==== Top half ====
Round of 32
17	Faisal Ashkanani (KUW)	9
16	Nguyễn Tiến Nhật (VIE)	15
9	Zhang Chengjie (CHN)	15
24	Mikhail Ivanov (KGZ)	9
25	Ebrahim Al-Tairi (QAT)	4
8	Elmir Alimzhanov (KAZ)	15
5	Park Kyoung-doo (KOR)	15
28	Bayarsaikhany Batkhüü (MGL)	6
21	Enkhtsogtyn Dölgöön (MGL)	1
12	Dong Chao (CHN)	15
13	Leung Ka Ming (HKG)	7
20	Ruslan Kudayev (UZB)	15

Round of 16
1	Dmitriy Alexanin (KAZ)	14
16	Nguyễn Tiến Nhật (VIE)	15
9	Zhang Chengjie (CHN)	9
8	Elmir Alimzhanov (KAZ)	12
5	Park Kyoung-doo (KOR)	11
12	Dong Chao (CHN)	8
20	Ruslan Kudayev (UZB)	12
4	Roman Petrov (KGZ)	15

Quarterfinals
16	Nguyễn Tiến Nhật (VIE)	8
8	Elmir Alimzhanov (KAZ)	7
5	Park Kyoung-doo (KOR)	15
4	Roman Petrov (KGZ)	10

Semifinals
16	Nguyễn Tiến Nhật (VIE)	8
5	Park Kyoung-doo (KOR)	11

==== Bottom half ====
Round of 32
19	Zakaria Al-Dawood (KSA)	15
14	Nguyễn Phước Đến (VIE)	12
11	Kazuyasu Minobe (JPN)	15
22	Muhanna Al-Hamoud (KSA)	8
27	Fahad Malallah (KUW)	8
6	Mohammad Rezaei (IRI)	15
7	Nicola Lu (HKG)	14
26	Mohammed Mirzaei (QAT)	10
23	Long Jie (MAC)	6
10	Keisuke Sakamoto (JPN)	15
15	Samson Lee (SIN)	13
18	Lim Wei Wen (SIN)	15

Round of 16
3	Jung Jin-sun (KOR)	15
19	Zakaria Al-Dawood (KSA)	7
11	Kazuyasu Minobe (JPN)	15
6	Mohammad Rezaei (IRI)	11
7	Nicola Lu (HKG)	15
10	Keisuke Sakamoto (JPN)	14
18	Lim Wei Wen (SIN)	15
2	Roman Aleksandrov (UZB)	8

Quarterfinals
3	Jung Jin-sun (KOR)	15
11	Kazuyasu Minobe (JPN)	11
7	Nicola Lu (HKG)	11
18	Lim Wei Wen (SIN)	15

Semifinals
3	Jung Jin-sun (KOR)	15
18	Lim Wei Wen (SIN)	5

== Final standing ==
Rank	Athlete
1st place, gold medalist(s)	Jung Jin-sun (KOR)
2nd place, silver medalist(s)	Park Kyoung-doo (KOR)
3rd place, bronze medalist(s)	Nguyễn Tiến Nhật (VIE)
3rd place, bronze medalist(s)	Lim Wei Wen (SIN)
5	Roman Petrov (KGZ)
6	Nicola Lu (HKG)
7	Elmir Alimzhanov (KAZ)
8	Kazuyasu Minobe (JPN)
9	Dmitriy Alexanin (KAZ)
10	Roman Aleksandrov (UZB)
11	Mohammad Rezaei (IRI)
12	Zhang Chengjie (CHN)
13	Keisuke Sakamoto (JPN)
14	Dong Chao (CHN)
15	Zakaria Al-Dawood (KSA)
16	Ruslan Kudayev (UZB)
17	Leung Ka Ming (HKG)
18	Nguyễn Phước Đến (VIE)
19	Samson Lee (SIN)
20	Faisal Ashkanani (KUW)
21	Enkhtsogtyn Dölgöön (MGL)
22	Muhanna Al-Hamoud (KSA)
23	Long Jie (MAC)
24	Mikhail Ivanov (KGZ)
25	Ebrahim Al-Tairi (QAT)
26	Mohammed Mirzaei (QAT)
27	Fahad Malallah (KUW)
28	Bayarsaikhany Batkhüü (MGL)
29	Ali Yaghoubian (IRI)
30	Ho Ka Hou (MAC)
31	Abdullah Al-Hammadi (UAE)
32	Saleh Al-Salehi (YEM)
33	Islam Samir (PLE)
34	Omkar Singh (NEP)
35	Janga Giri (NEP)
