= Fencing at the 2010 Asian Games – Men's individual épée =

Men's individual épée at the 2010 Asian Games
- Venue: Guangda Gymnasium
- Date: 18 November 2010
- Competitors: 31 from 18 nations

Medalists
gold medal	Kim Won-jin	South Korea
silver medal	Li Guojie	China
bronze medal	Yin Lianchi	China
bronze medal	Shogo Nishida	Japan

The men's individual épée competition at the 2010 Asian Games in Guangzhou was held on 18 November at the Guangda Gymnasium.

== Schedule ==
All times are China Standard Time (UTC+08:00)

Date	Time	Event
Thursday, 18 November 2010	12:30	Round of pools
Thursday, 18 November 2010	14:00	Round of 32
Thursday, 18 November 2010	15:20	Round of 16
Thursday, 18 November 2010	16:40	Quarterfinals
Thursday, 18 November 2010	18:40	Semifinals
Thursday, 18 November 2010	20:00	Gold medal match

== Results ==
=== Round of pools ===
==== Pool 1 ====
Athlete	KOR	KGZ	IRI	UZB	LIB	VIE	JOR
Jung Seung-hwa (KOR)	—	3–5	5–3	5–2	5–1	5–2	5–2
Serguei Katchiourine (KGZ)	5–3	—	1–0	4–5	4–5	2–0	5–1
Mohammad Rezaei (IRI)	3–5	0–1	—	5–2	4–5	5–3	4–5
Roman Aleksandrov (UZB)	2–5	5–4	2–5	—	3–5	4–3	5–4
Alessandro Michon (LIB)	1–5	5–4	5–4	5–3	—	5–2	5–3
Đỗ Hữu Cường (VIE)	2–5	0–2	3–5	3–4	2–5	—	5–1
Fahed Abu Assaf (JOR)	2–5	1–5	5–4	4–5	3–5	1–5	—

==== Pool 2 ====
Athlete	CHN	UZB	KAZ	THA	VIE	KSA
Li Guojie (CHN)	—	5–1	5–2	4–3	5–1	4–5
Ruslan Kudayev (UZB)	1–5	—	5–4	5–2	2–5	5–0
Alexandr Axenov (KAZ)	2–5	4–5	—	5–2	5–3	5–0
Witsarach Kongsuwankeeree (THA)	3–4	2–5	2–5	—	5–4	5–2
Nguyễn Tiến Nhật (VIE)	1–5	5–2	3–5	4–5	—	5–4
Juma Al-Khaldi (KSA)	5–4	0–5	0–5	2–5	4–5	—

==== Pool 3 ====
Athlete	IRI	KOR	KGZ	IND	QAT	IOC
Ali Yaghoubian (IRI)	—	3–5	3–5	5–2	3–5	5–3
Kim Won-jin (KOR)	5–3	—	5–4	5–1	5–0	5–0
Mikhail Ivanov (KGZ)	5–3	4–5	—	5–3	5–3	2–5
Amardeep Basediya (IND)	2–5	1–5	3–5	—	4–5	2–5
Fahad Al-Yami (QAT)	5–3	0–5	3–5	5–4	—	3–5
Fahad Malallah (IOC)	3–5	0–5	5–2	5–2	5–3	—

==== Pool 4 ====
Athlete	KAZ	JPN	HKG	QAT	IND	IOC
Elmir Alimzhanov (KAZ)	—	5–2	5–2	5–0	5–2	5–4
Keisuke Sakamoto (JPN)	2–5	—	5–2	5–2	5–1	5–4
Lau Kam Tan (HKG)	2–5	2–5	—	3–5	5–3	3–5
Mohammed Mirzaei (QAT)	0–5	2–5	5–3	—	2–5	2–5
Ajinkya Dudhare (IND)	2–5	1–5	3–5	5–2	—	2–1
Qaisar Al-Zamel (IOC)	4–5	4–5	5–3	5–2	1–2	—

==== Pool 5 ====
Athlete	JPN	CHN	HKG	MAS	UAE	KSA
Shogo Nishida (JPN)	—	0–5	2–5	5–3	5–3	3–5
Yin Lianchi (CHN)	5–0	—	5–4	4–5	5–1	5–3
Tsui Yiu Chung (HKG)	5–2	4–5	—	5–4	5–1	5–3
Joshua Koh (MAS)	3–5	5–4	4–5	—	5–2	4–5
Abdullah Al-Hammadi (UAE)	3–5	1–5	1–5	2–5	—	0–5
Nasser Al-Omairi (KSA)	5–3	3–5	3–5	5–4	5–0	—

==== Summary ====
Rank	Pool	Athlete	W	L	W/M	TD	TF
1	3	Kim Won-jin (KOR)	5	0	1.000	+17	25
2	4	Elmir Alimzhanov (KAZ)	5	0	1.000	+15	25
3	1	Jung Seung-hwa (KOR)	5	1	0.833	+13	28
4	1	Alessandro Michon (LIB)	5	1	0.833	+5	26
5	5	Yin Lianchi (CHN)	4	1	0.800	+11	24
6	2	Li Guojie (CHN)	4	1	0.800	+11	23
7	5	Tsui Yiu Chung (HKG)	4	1	0.800	+9	24
8	4	Keisuke Sakamoto (JPN)	4	1	0.800	+8	22
9	1	Serguei Katchiourine (KGZ)	4	2	0.667	+7	21
10	2	Alexandr Axenov (KAZ)	3	2	0.600	+6	21
11	5	Nasser Al-Omairi (KSA)	3	2	0.600	+4	21
12	3	Mikhail Ivanov (KGZ)	3	2	0.600	+2	21
13	2	Ruslan Kudayev (UZB)	3	2	0.600	+2	18
14	3	Fahad Malallah (IOC)	3	2	0.600	+1	18
15	1	Roman Aleksandrov (UZB)	3	3	0.500	−5	21
16	4	Qaisar Al-Zamel (IOC)	2	3	0.400	+2	19
17	5	Joshua Koh (MAS)	2	3	0.400	0	21
18	3	Ali Yaghoubian (IRI)	2	3	0.400	−1	19
19	2	Nguyễn Tiến Nhật (VIE)	2	3	0.400	−3	21
20	2	Witsarach Kongsuwankeeree (THA)	2	3	0.400	−3	20
21	4	Ajinkya Dudhare (IND)	2	3	0.400	−5	13
22	3	Fahad Al-Yami (QAT)	2	3	0.400	−6	16
23	5	Shogo Nishida (JPN)	2	3	0.400	−6	15
24	1	Mohammad Rezaei (IRI)	2	4	0.333	0	21
25	4	Lau Kam Tan (HKG)	1	4	0.200	−8	15
26	4	Mohammed Mirzaei (QAT)	1	4	0.200	−12	11
27	2	Juma Al-Khaldi (KSA)	1	4	0.200	−13	11
28	1	Đỗ Hữu Cường (VIE)	1	5	0.167	−7	15
29	1	Fahed Abu Assaf (JOR)	1	5	0.167	−13	16
30	3	Amardeep Basediya (IND)	0	5	0.000	−13	12
31	5	Abdullah Al-Hammadi (UAE)	0	5	0.000	−18	7

=== Knockout round ===
==== Final ====
Gold medal match
1	Kim Won-jin (KOR)	13
6	Li Guojie (CHN)	11

==== Top half ====
Round of 32
17	Joshua Koh (MAS)	12
16	Qaisar Al-Zamel (IOC)	15
9	Serguei Katchiourine (KGZ)	15
24	Mohammad Rezaei (IRI)	7
21	Ajinkya Dudhare (IND)	6
12	Mikhail Ivanov (KGZ)	15
13	Ruslan Kudayev (UZB)	15
20	Witsarach Kongsuwankeeree (THA)	6

Round of 16
1	Kim Won-jin (KOR)	14
16	Qaisar Al-Zamel (IOC)	13
9	Serguei Katchiourine (KGZ)	13
8	Keisuke Sakamoto (JPN)	14
5	Yin Lianchi (CHN)	15
12	Mikhail Ivanov (KGZ)	8
13	Ruslan Kudayev (UZB)	15
4	Alessandro Michon (LIB)	11

Quarterfinals
1	Kim Won-jin (KOR)	15
8	Keisuke Sakamoto (JPN)	6
5	Yin Lianchi (CHN)	15
13	Ruslan Kudayev (UZB)	14

Semifinals
1	Kim Won-jin (KOR)	9
5	Yin Lianchi (CHN)	8

==== Bottom half ====
Round of 32
19	Nguyễn Tiến Nhật (VIE)	15
14	Fahad Malallah (IOC)	4
11	Nasser Al-Omairi (KSA)	15
22	Fahad Al-Yami (QAT)	13
23	Shogo Nishida (JPN)	15
10	Alexandr Axenov (KAZ)	9
15	Roman Aleksandrov (UZB)	12
18	Ali Yaghoubian (IRI)	15

Round of 16
3	Jung Seung-hwa (KOR)	15
19	Nguyễn Tiến Nhật (VIE)	7
11	Nasser Al-Omairi (KSA)	6
6	Li Guojie (CHN)	15
7	Tsui Yiu Chung (HKG)	4
23	Shogo Nishida (JPN)	6
18	Ali Yaghoubian (IRI)	7
2	Elmir Alimzhanov (KAZ)	15

Quarterfinals
3	Jung Seung-hwa (KOR)	14
6	Li Guojie (CHN)	15
23	Shogo Nishida (JPN)	15
2	Elmir Alimzhanov (KAZ)	11

Semifinals
6	Li Guojie (CHN)	15
23	Shogo Nishida (JPN)	13

== Final standing ==
Rank	Athlete
1st place, gold medalist(s)	Kim Won-jin (KOR)
2nd place, silver medalist(s)	Li Guojie (CHN)
3rd place, bronze medalist(s)	Yin Lianchi (CHN)
3rd place, bronze medalist(s)	Shogo Nishida (JPN)
5	Elmir Alimzhanov (KAZ)
6	Jung Seung-hwa (KOR)
7	Keisuke Sakamoto (JPN)
8	Ruslan Kudayev (UZB)
9	Alessandro Michon (LIB)
10	Tsui Yiu Chung (HKG)
11	Serguei Katchiourine (KGZ)
12	Nasser Al-Omairi (KSA)
13	Mikhail Ivanov (KGZ)
14	Qaisar Al-Zamel (IOC)
15	Ali Yaghoubian (IRI)
16	Nguyễn Tiến Nhật (VIE)
17	Alexandr Axenov (KAZ)
18	Fahad Malallah (IOC)
19	Roman Aleksandrov (UZB)
20	Joshua Koh (MAS)
21	Witsarach Kongsuwankeeree (THA)
22	Ajinkya Dudhare (IND)
23	Fahad Al-Yami (QAT)
24	Mohammad Rezaei (IRI)
25	Lau Kam Tan (HKG)
26	Mohammed Mirzaei (QAT)
27	Juma Al-Khaldi (KSA)
28	Đỗ Hữu Cường (VIE)
29	Fahed Abu Assaf (JOR)
30	Amardeep Basediya (IND)
31	Abdullah Al-Hammadi (UAE)
