= Fencing at the 2012 Summer Olympics – Men's épée =

Men's épée at the Games of the XXX Olympiad
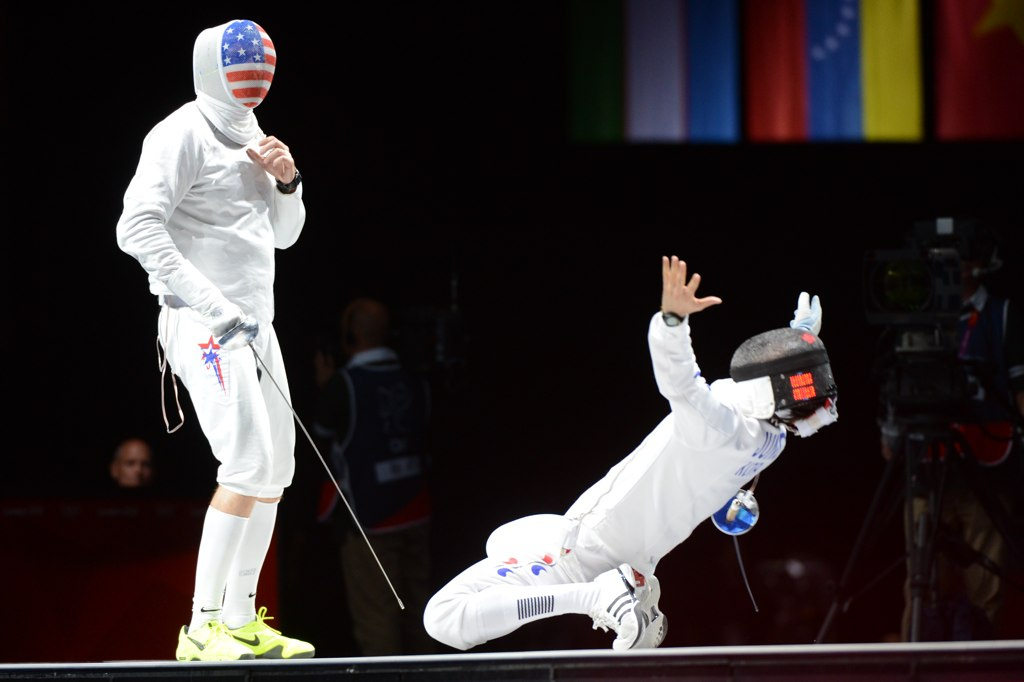
- Jung Jin-Sun (KOR) wins the bronze medal match over Seth Kelsey (USA) in sudden-death overtime
- Venue: ExCeL London
- Date: 1 August
- Competitors: 30 from 24 nations

Medalists
1st place, gold medalist(s)		Rubén Limardo	Venezuela
2nd place, silver medalist(s)		Bartosz Piasecki	Norway
3rd place, bronze medalist(s)		Jung Jin-Sun	South Korea

The men's épée competition in fencing at the 2012 Summer Olympics in London was held on 1 August at the ExCeL London Exhibition Centre. There were 30 competitors from 24 nations. Rubén Limardo of Venezuela won the gold medal – the country's only medal of the 2012 Games as well as the country's first medal in men's individual épée. Norway's Bartosz Piasecki won silver (that nation's first medal in the event, as well) and Jung Jin-Sun from South Korea took bronze.

== Background ==
This was the 26th appearance of the event, which was not held at the first Games in 1896 (with only foil and sabre events held) but has been held at every Summer Olympics since 1900.

Three of the eight quarterfinalists from 2008 returned: fifth-place finisher Jung Jin-Sun of South Korea, sixth-place finisher Radosław Zawrotniak of Poland, and eighth-place finisher Bas Verwijlen of the Netherlands. Paolo Pizzo of Italy was the reigning (2011) World Champion, with 2010 champion Nikolai Novosjolov of Estonia also competing in London.

Senegal and Uzbekistan each made their debut in the event. France and the United States each appeared for the 24th time, tied for most among nations.

== Qualification ==
Nations were limited to three fencers each from 1928 to 2004. However, the 2008 Games introduced a rotation of men's team fencing events with one weapon left off each Games; the individual event without a corresponding team event had the number of fencers per nation reduced to two. The men's rotation started with foil (2008) and épée (2012), with sabre scheduled to skip its team event in 2016. Thus, the maximum for individual épée in 2012 was two per nation.

There were 30 dedicated quota spots for men's épée. The first 12 spots went to the top fencers by world ranking. Next, 8 more men were selected from the world rankings based on continents: 2 each from Europe, the Americas, Asia/Oceania, and Africa. Finally, 10 spots were allocated by continental qualifying events: 4 from Europe, 2 from the Americas, 3 from Asia/Oceania, and 1 from Africa.

Additionally, there were 8 host/invitational spots that could be spread throughout the various fencing events. Great Britain chose not to use any of its places in the men's épée.

== Competition format ==
The épée competition, following the format introduced in 1996, consisted of a five-round single-elimination bracket with a bronze medal match between the two semifinal losers. Fencing was done to 15 touches or to the completion of three three-minute rounds if neither fencer reached 15 touches by then. At the end of time, the higher-scoring fencer was the winner; a tie resulted in an additional one-minute sudden-death time period. This sudden-death period was further modified by the selection of a draw-winner beforehand; if neither fencer scored a touch during the minute, the predetermined draw-winner won the bout.

== Schedule ==
All times are British Summer Time (UTC+1)

Date	Time	Round
Wednesday, 1 August 2012	9:00	Round of 32; Round of 16; Quarterfinals; Semifinals; Bronze medal match Final

== Results ==
=== Top half ===
Round of 32
Weston Kelsey (USA)	8
Li Guojie (CHN)	7
Silvio Fernández (VEN)	15
Dmitriy Alexanin (KAZ)	12
Ruslan Kudayev (UZB)	15
Park Kyoung-Doo (KOR)	9
Max Heinzer (SUI)	15
Paris Inostroza (CHI)	2
Ayman Fayez (EGY)	13
Rubén Limardo (VEN)	15
Radosław Zawrotniak (POL)	9
Alexandre Bouzaid (SEN)	15
Leung Ka Ming (HKG)	14
Paolo Pizzo (ITA)	15

Round of 16
Nikolai Novosjolov (EST)	11
Weston Kelsey (USA)	15
Silvio Fernández (VEN)	15
Ruslan Kudayev (UZB)	3
Max Heinzer (SUI)	11
Rubén Limardo (VEN)	15
Alexandre Bouzaid (SEN)	11
Paolo Pizzo (ITA)	15

Quarter-finals
Weston Kelsey (USA)	15
Silvio Fernández (VEN)	9
Rubén Limardo (VEN)	15
Paolo Pizzo (ITA)	12

Semi-finals
Weston Kelsey (USA)	5
Rubén Limardo (VEN)	6

=== Bottom half ===
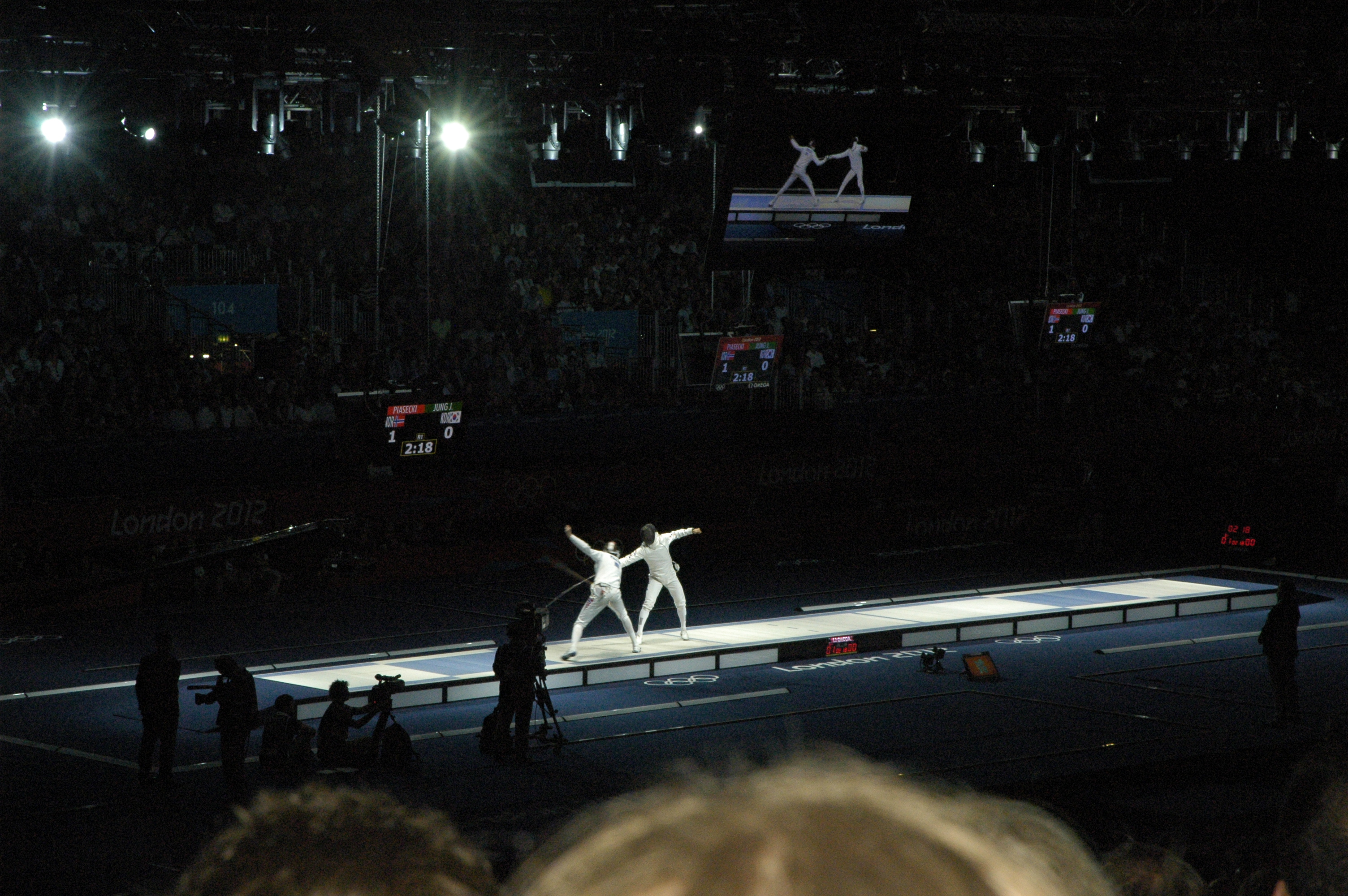
The semi final of Bartosz Piasecki versus Jung Jin-Sun

Round of 32
Elmir Alimzhanov (KAZ)	15
Nguyen Tien Nhat (VIE)	9
Pavel Sukhov (RUS)	11
Jung Jin-Sun (KOR)	15
Soren Thompson (USA)	4
Jörg Fiedler (GER)	15
Athos Schwantes (BRA)	10
Bas Verwijlen (NED)	15
Géza Imre (HUN)	15
Abdelkarim El Haouari (MAR)	8
Bartosz Piasecki (NOR)	14
Gauthier Grumier (FRA)	13
Dmytro Karyuchenko (UKR)	10
Yannick Borel (FRA)	15

Round of 16
Elmir Alimzhanov (KAZ)	8
Jung Jin-Sun (KOR)	15
Jörg Fiedler (GER)	15
Bas Verwijlen (NED)	8
Géza Imre (HUN)	7
Bartosz Piasecki (NOR)	15
Yannick Borel (FRA)	15
Fabian Kauter (SUI)	11

Quarter-finals
Jung Jin-Sun (KOR)	15
Jörg Fiedler (GER)	11
Bartosz Piasecki (NOR)	15
Yannick Borel (FRA)	14

Semi-finals
Jung Jin-Sun (KOR)	13
Bartosz Piasecki (NOR)	15

=== Finals ===
Semi-finals
Weston Kelsey (USA)	5
Rubén Limardo (VEN)	6
Jung Jin-Sun (KOR)	13
Bartosz Piasecki (NOR)	15

Final
Rubén Limardo (VEN)	15
Bartosz Piasecki (NOR)	10
Bronze medal match
Weston Kelsey (USA)	11
Jung Jin-Sun (KOR)	12

== Results summary ==
Rank	Fencer	Nation
1st place, gold medalist(s)	Rubén Limardo	Venezuela
2nd place, silver medalist(s)	Bartosz Piasecki	Norway
3rd place, bronze medalist(s)	Jung Jin-Sun	South Korea
4	Seth Kelsey	United States
5	Paolo Pizzo	Italy
6	Silvio Fernández	Venezuela
7	Yannick Borel	France
8	Jörg Fiedler	Germany
9	Nikolai Novosjolov	Estonia
10	Fabian Kauter	Switzerland
11	Elmir Alimzhanov	Kazakhstan
12	Max Heinzer	Switzerland
13	Bas Verwijlen	Netherlands
14	Géza Imre	Hungary
15	Alexandre Bouzaid	Senegal
16	Ruslan Kudayev	Uzbekistan
17	Park Kyoung-Doo	South Korea
18	Gauthier Grumier	France
19	Soren Thompson	United States
20	Radosław Zawrotniak	Poland
21	Li Guojie	China
22	Dmytro Kariuchenko	Ukraine
23	Pavel Sukhov	Russia
24	Ayman Fayez	Egypt
25	Dmitry Aleksanin	Kazakhstan
26	Abdelkarim El Haouari	Morocco
27	Paris Inostroza	Chile
28	Athos Schwantes	Brazil
29	Nguyễn Tiến Nhật	Vietnam
30	Leung Ka Ming	Hong Kong
