= Men's team épée at the 2015 World Fencing Championships =

The Men's team épée event of the 2015 World Fencing Championships was held on 17–18 July 2015.

== Medalists ==
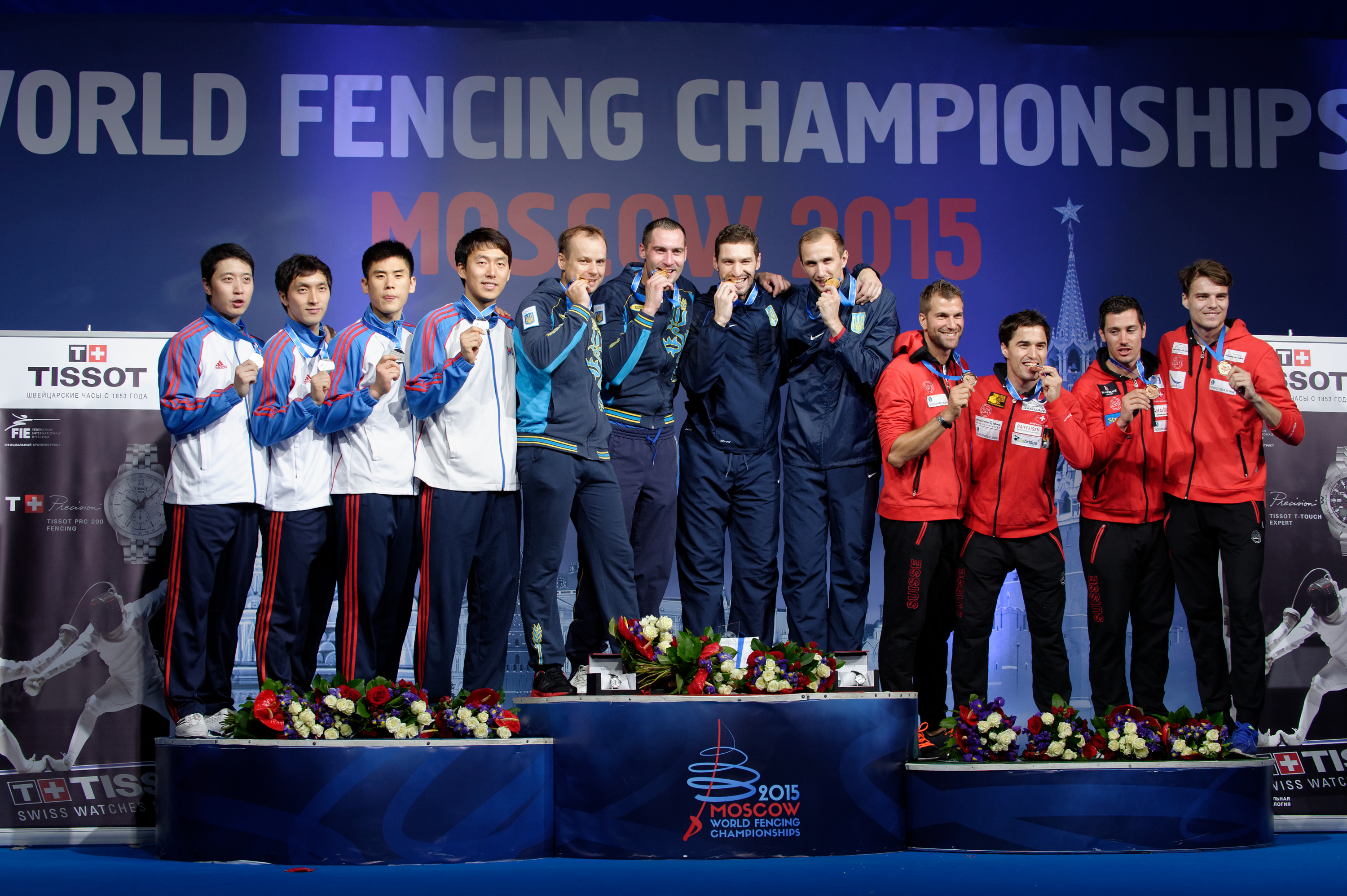
From left to right, South Korea, Ukraine and Switzerland

Gold	Ukraine; Anatoliy Herey; Dmytro Karyuchenko; Maksym Khvorost; Bohdan Nikishyn
Silver	South Korea; Jung Seung-hwa; Kweon Young-jun; Na Jong-kwan; Park Kyoung-doo
Bronze	Switzerland; Peer Borsky; Max Heinzer; Fabian Kauter; Benjamin Steffen

== Draw ==
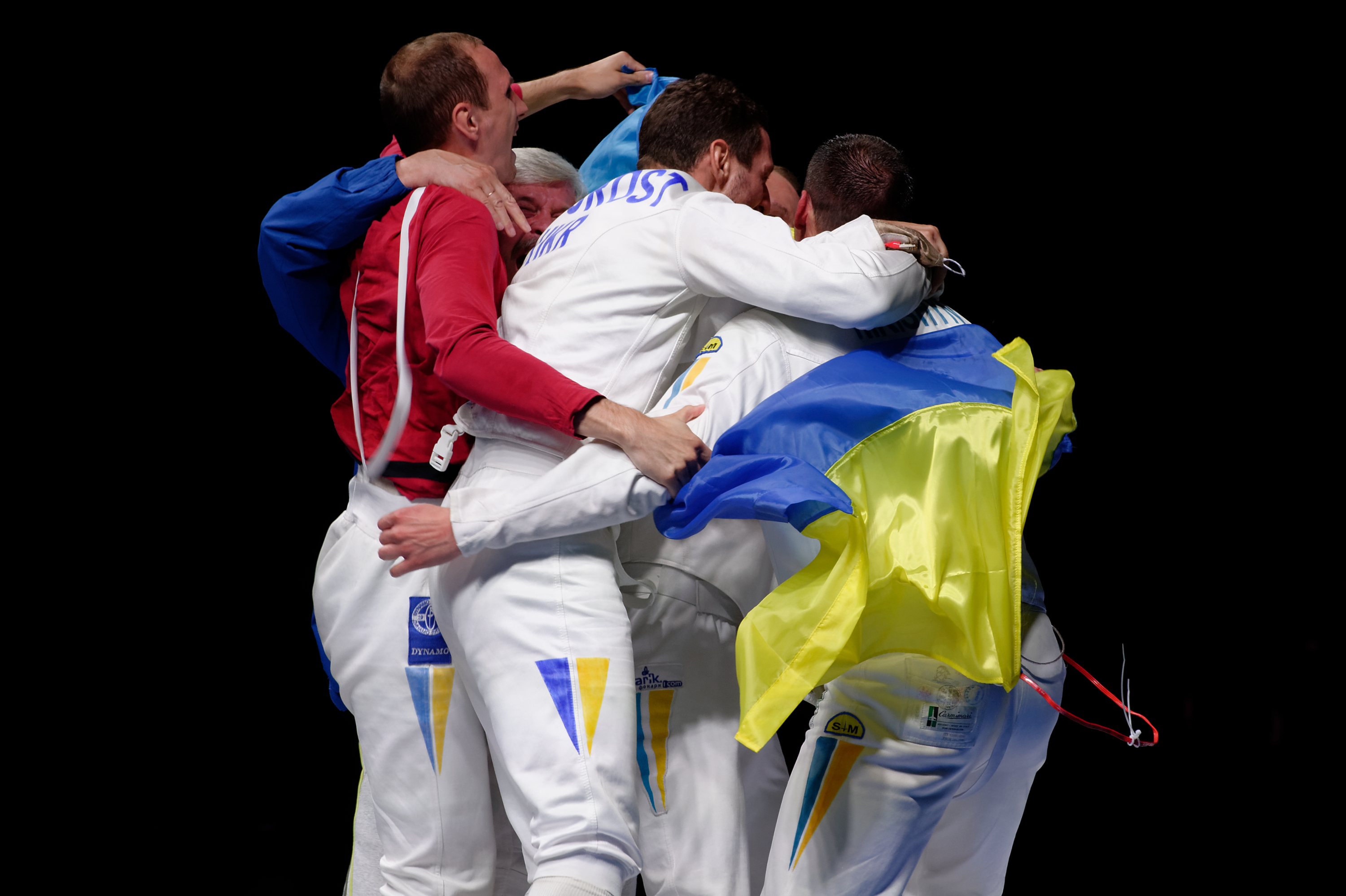
Ukraine celebrate their victory over South Korea in the final

=== Finals ===
Semifinals
Italy	11
Ukraine	15
Switzerland	37
South Korea	45

Final
Ukraine	34
South Korea	24
Third place
Italy	24
Switzerland	38

=== Top half ===
==== Section 1 ====
Round of 64
33	Australia	40
32	Sweden	45

Round of 32
1	France	45
32	Sweden	37
17	Japan	45
16	Estonia	29
9	Czech Republic	45
24	Netherlands	38
25	Morocco	24
8	Italy	38

Round of 16
1	France	45
17	Japan	28
9	Czech Republic	36
8	Italy	37

Quarterfinals
1	France	42
8	Italy	44

==== Section 2 ====
Round of 64
37	Mongolia	28
28	Finland	45
29	Cuba	45
36	Vietnam	32

Round of 32
5	Russia	45
28	Finland	29
21	Kyrgyzstan	31
12	Venezuela	36
13	Spain	45
20	Egypt	41
29	Cuba	33
4	Ukraine	45

Round of 16
5	Russia	45
12	Venezuela	35
13	Spain	33
4	Ukraine	45

Quarterfinals
5	Russia	33
4	Ukraine	34

=== Bottom half ===
==== Section 3 ====
Round of 64
35	Turkey	35
30	Colombia	45
27	Uzbekistan	45
38	Kuwait	30

Round of 32
3	Switzerland	45
30	Colombia	38
19	Denmark	35
14	Israel	45
11	Poland	45
22	Argentina	33
27	Uzbekistan	11
6	Germany	12

Round of 16
3	Switzerland	45
14	Israel	41
11	Poland	4
6	Germany	5

Quarterfinals
3	Switzerland	45
6	Germany	33

==== Section 4 ====
Round of 64
31	Mexico	45
34	Ghana	23

Round of 32
7	Hungary	45
26	Hong Kong	28
23	Canada	39
10	United States	38
15	Kazakhstan	45
18	China	44
31	Mexico	30
2	South Korea	45

Round of 16
7	Hungary	45
23	Canada	26
15	Kazakhstan	44
2	South Korea	45

Quarterfinals
7	Hungary	24
2	South Korea	25

=== Placement rounds ===
==== 5–8th place ====
5–8th place semifinals
France	45
Russia	36
Germany	41
Hungary	44

Fifth place
France	45
Hungary	36
Seventh place
Russia	45
Germany	24

==== 9–16th place ====
9–16th place quarterfinals
Japan	44
Czech Republic	45
Venezuela	41
Spain	44
Israel	39
Poland	45
Canada	45
Kazakhstan	39

9–12th place semifinals
Czech Republic	44
Spain	43
Poland	39
Canada	45

Ninth place
Czech Republic	37
Canada	33
Eleventh place
Spain	45
Poland	36

==== 13–16th place ====
13–16th place semifinals
Japan	45
Venezuela	37
Israel	41
Kazakhstan	45

13th place
Japan	45
Kazakhstan	30
15th place
Venezuela	15
Israel	34

== Final classification ==
Rank	Nation
1st place, gold medalist(s)	Ukraine
2nd place, silver medalist(s)	South Korea
3rd place, bronze medalist(s)	Switzerland
4	Italy
5	France
6	Hungary
7	Russia
8	Germany
9	Czech Republic
10	Canada
11	Spain
12	Poland
13	Japan
14	Kazakhstan
15	Israel
16	Venezuela
17	United States
18	Estonia
19	China
20	Denmark
21	Egypt
22	Kyrgyzstan
23	Argentina
24	Netherlands
25	Morocco
26	Hong Kong
27	Kuwait
28	Finland
29	Cuba
30	Colombia
31	Mexico
32	Sweden
33	Australia
34	Ghana
35	Turkey
36	Vietnam
37	Mongolia
38	Kuwait
