= Enrico Garozzo =

Italian fencer

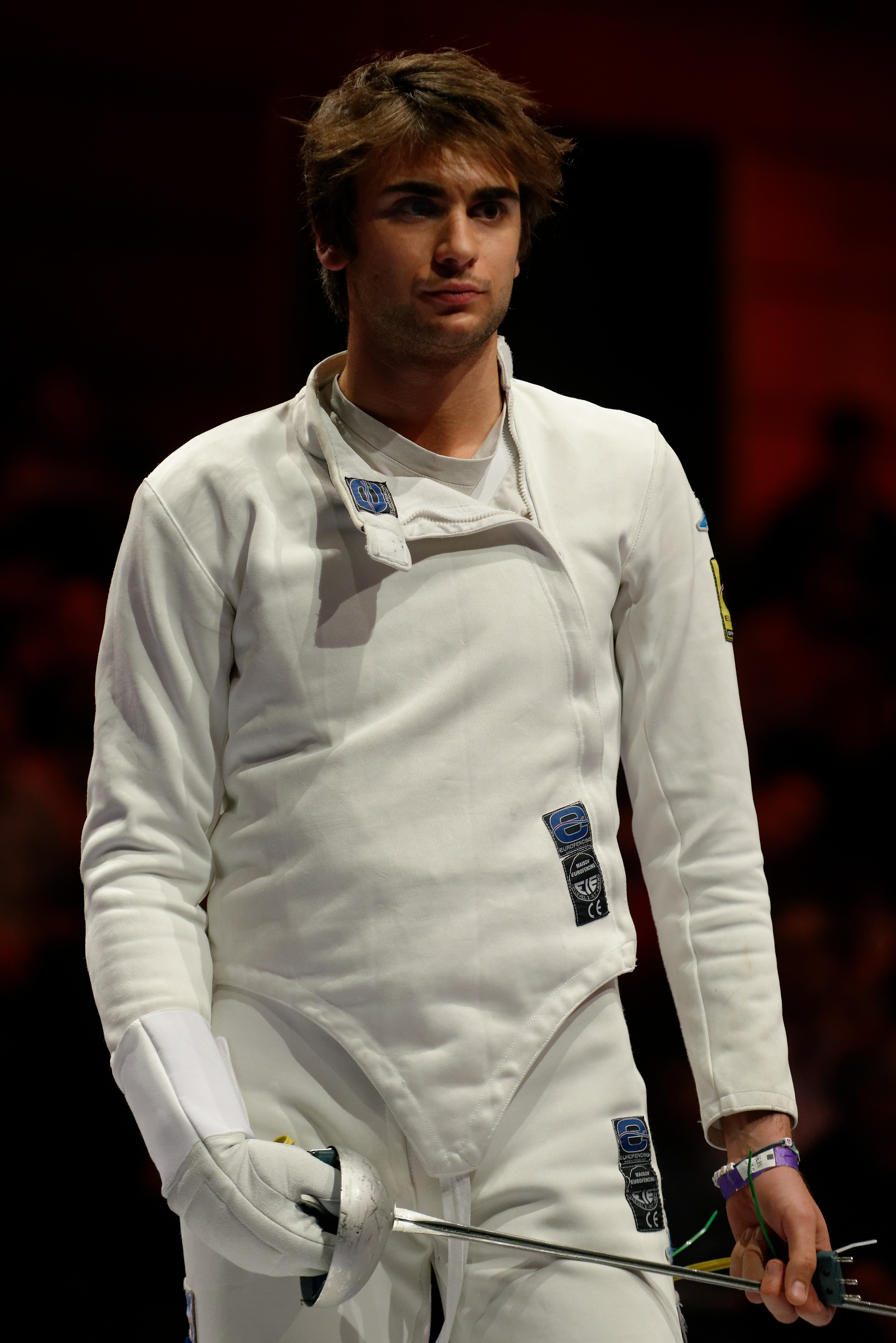
- Garozzo at the 2013 Paris World Cup

Personal information
- Born: 21 June 1989 (age 37) Catania, Sicily

Fencing career
- Sport: Fencing
- Weapon: épée
- Hand: right-handed
- National coach: Sandro Cuomo
- Club: Centro Sportivo Carabinieri
- Head coach: Andrea Candiani
- Former coach: Domenico Patti
- FIE ranking: current ranking
Medal record
Olympic Games
Silver medal – second place	2016 Rio de Janeiro	Team épée
World Championships
Bronze medal – third place	2014 Kazan	Individual
European Championships
Silver medal – second place	2016 Toruń	Team
Bronze medal – third place	2018 Novi Sad	Team
Bronze medal – third place	2019 Düsseldorf	Individual

Enrico Garozzo ([enˈriːko ɡaˈrɔttso]; born 21 June 1989) is an Italian right-handed épée fencer and 2016 Olympic silver medalist.

Garozzo is an athlete of the Centro Sportivo Carabinieri.

== Biography ==
Garozzo won a silver medal at the 2006 Cadets World Fencing Championship in Taebaek, then took the gold at the 2008 Junior World Fencing Championship in his childhood city Acireale.

Amongst seniors, he made his first Fencing World Cup podium in 2010 with a third place in the Grand Prix de Berne. This was followed in the 2011–12 season by a second place at the Jockey Club Argentino.

In the 2012–13 season he placed third in the Heidenheimer Pokal and in the 2013 Mediterranean Games at Mersin. He advanced to the quarter-finals in the 2013 European Championships at Budapest before being stopped by eventual silver medallist Daniel Jerent. In the 2013–14 season, he won a silver medal in the Doha Grand Prix and took a bronze medal at the World Championships in Kazan after losing in the semifinals to South Korea's Park Kyoung-doo. He finished the season 4th in world rankings, a career best.

In the 2014–15 season Garozzo won a bronze medal in the Doha Grand Prix.

Enrico's younger brother, Daniele, is a foil fencer. He lives in Milan with Estonian fencer Erika Kirpu.

== Medal Record ==
=== Olympic Games ===
Year	Location	Event	Position
2016	Rio de Janeiro, Brazil	Team Men's Épée	2nd

=== World Championship ===
Year	Location	Event	Position
2014	Kazan, Russia	Individual Men's Épée	3rd

=== European Championship ===
Year	Location	Event	Position
2016	Toruń, Poland	Team Men's Épée	2nd
2018	Novi Sad, Serbia	Team Men's Épée	3rd
2019	Düsseldorf, Germany	Individual Men's Épée	3rd

=== Grand Prix ===
Year	Location	Event	Position
01/16/2014	Doha, Qatar	Individual Men's Épée	2nd
12/05/2014	Doha, Qatar	Individual Men's Épée	3rd
03/18/2016	Budapest, Hungary	Individual Men's Épée	2nd

=== World Cup ===
Date	Location	Event	Position
02/27/2010	Bern, Switzerland	Individual Men's Épée	3rd
06/29/2012	Buenos Aires, Argentina	Individual Men's Épée	3rd
02/15/2013	Heidenheim, Germany	Individual Men's Épée	3rd
01/22/2015	Heidenheim, Germany	Individual Men's Épée	3rd
11/13/2015	Tallinn, Estonia	Individual Men's Épée	3rd
02/12/2016	Vancouver, Canada	Individual Men's Épée	1st
02/08/2019	Vancouver, Canada	Individual Men's Épée	2nd
