= Abdelkarim El Haouari =

Moroccan fencer (born 1993)

Abdelkarim El Haouari (born 19 December 1993) is a Moroccan fencer. At the 2012 Summer Olympics he competed in the Men's épée, but was defeated in the first round.
