= Patrick Jørgensen =

Danish fencer (born 1991)

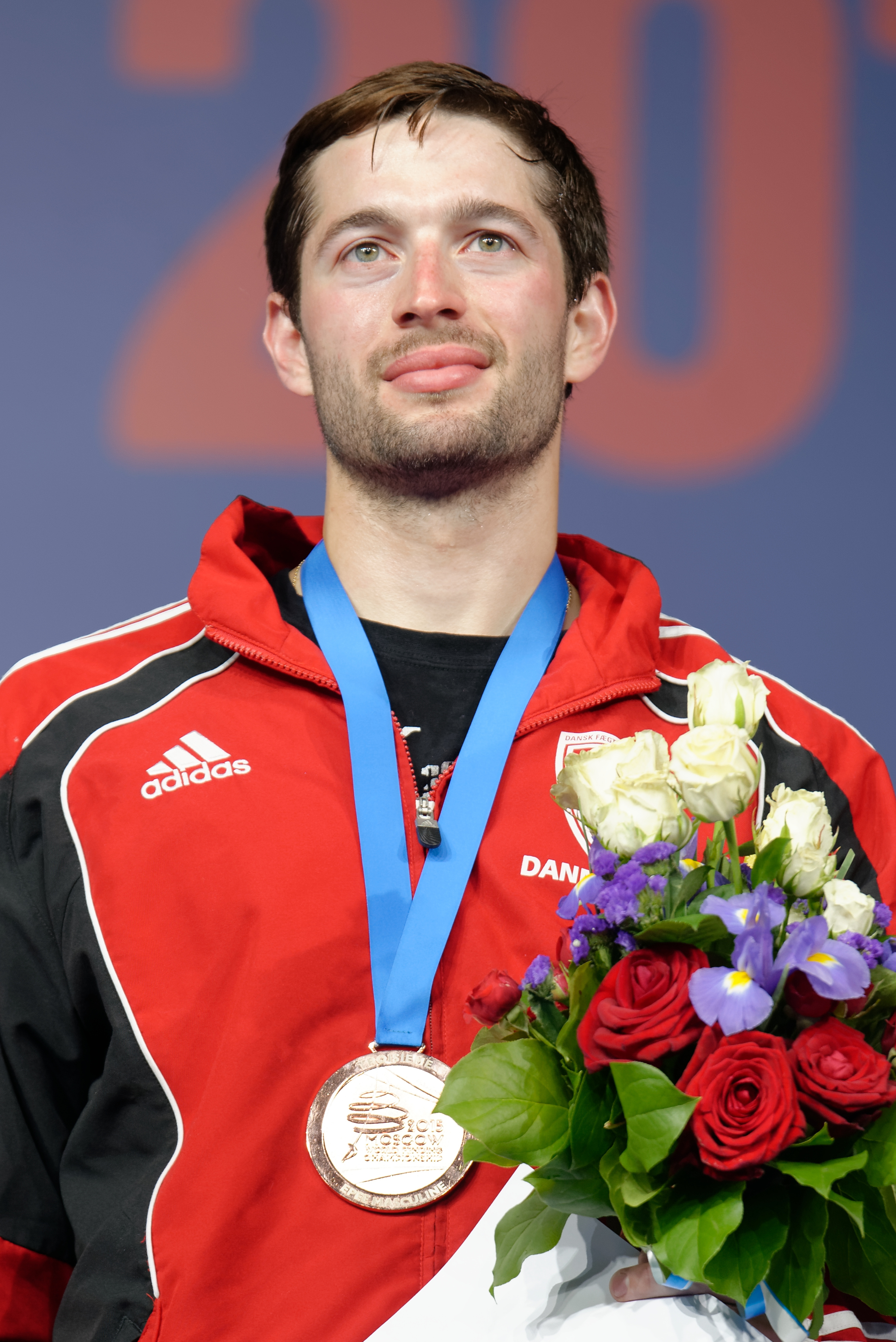

Personal information
- Born: 31 May 1991 (age 35) Copenhagen, Denmark

Fencing career
- Sport: Fencing
- Weapon: épée
- Hand: right-handed
- National coach: Ferenc Tóth
- Club: Hellerup Fægte Klub
- FIE ranking: current ranking
Medal record
Men's épée
Representing Denmark
World Championships
| Bronze medal – third place | 2015 Moscow | Individual |
European Championships
| Silver medal – second place | 2019 Düsseldorf | Team |

Patrick Jørgensen (born 31 May 1991) is a Danish épée fencer, individual bronze medallist at the 2015 World Fencing Championships.

Ranked No.102 before the competition, Jørgensen created a surprise by defeating notably Olympic silver medallists Gábor Boczkó and Bartosz Piasecki to reach the semi-finals, where he lost to World No.1 Gauthier Grumier. He came away with a bronze medal, the first significant achievement of his career and the first Danish medal in a men's event at the World Fencing Championships since Mogens Lüchow in 1950.
