= Roman Petrov =

Kyrgyzstani fencer (born 1991)

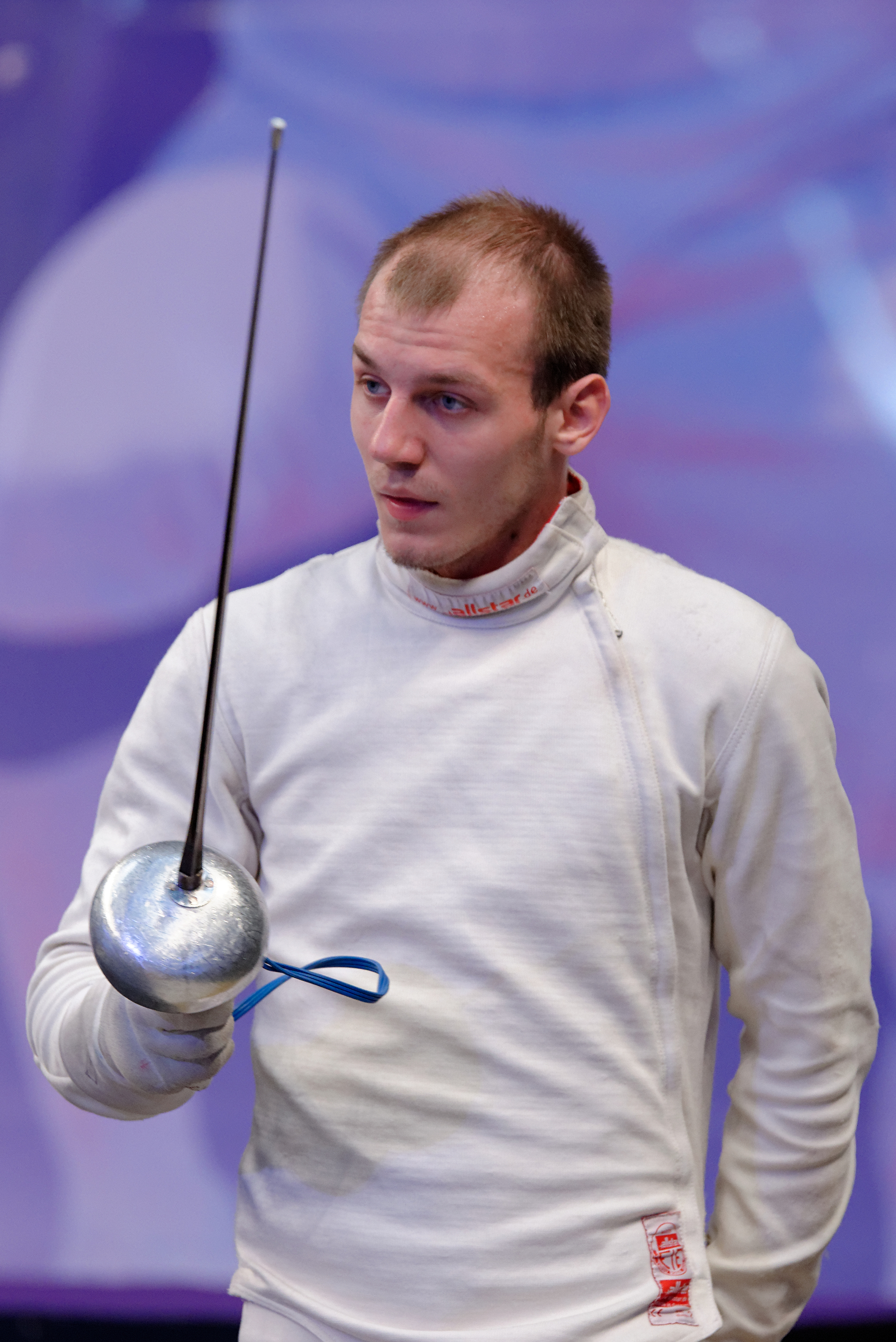

Personal information
- Nationality: Kyrgyz
- Born: September 19, 1991 (age 34) Bishkek

Sport
- Country: Kyrgyzstan
- Sport: Fencing
- Event: epee
Medal record
Islamic Solidarity Games
Gold medal – first place	2021 Konya	Épée

Roman Petrov (born 19 September 1991) is a Kyrgyzstani fencer.

== Career ==
He competed at the 2013 World Fencing Championships and at the 2014 World Fencing Championships. He received Master of Sport of International Class in Kyrgyzstan following his notable performances at the 2014 Asian Championships. He represented Kyrgyzstan at the 2014 Asian Games which was his maiden appearance at the Asian Games. During the 2014 Asian Games, he competed in both men's individual épée and men's team épée events. He also made his second Asian Games appearance during the 2018 Asian Games.

He represented Kyrgyzstan at the 2020 Summer Olympics which also marked his debut appearance at the Olympics. During the 2020 Summer Olympics, he competed in the men's épée event.
