= Peer Borsky =

Swiss fencer (born 1990)

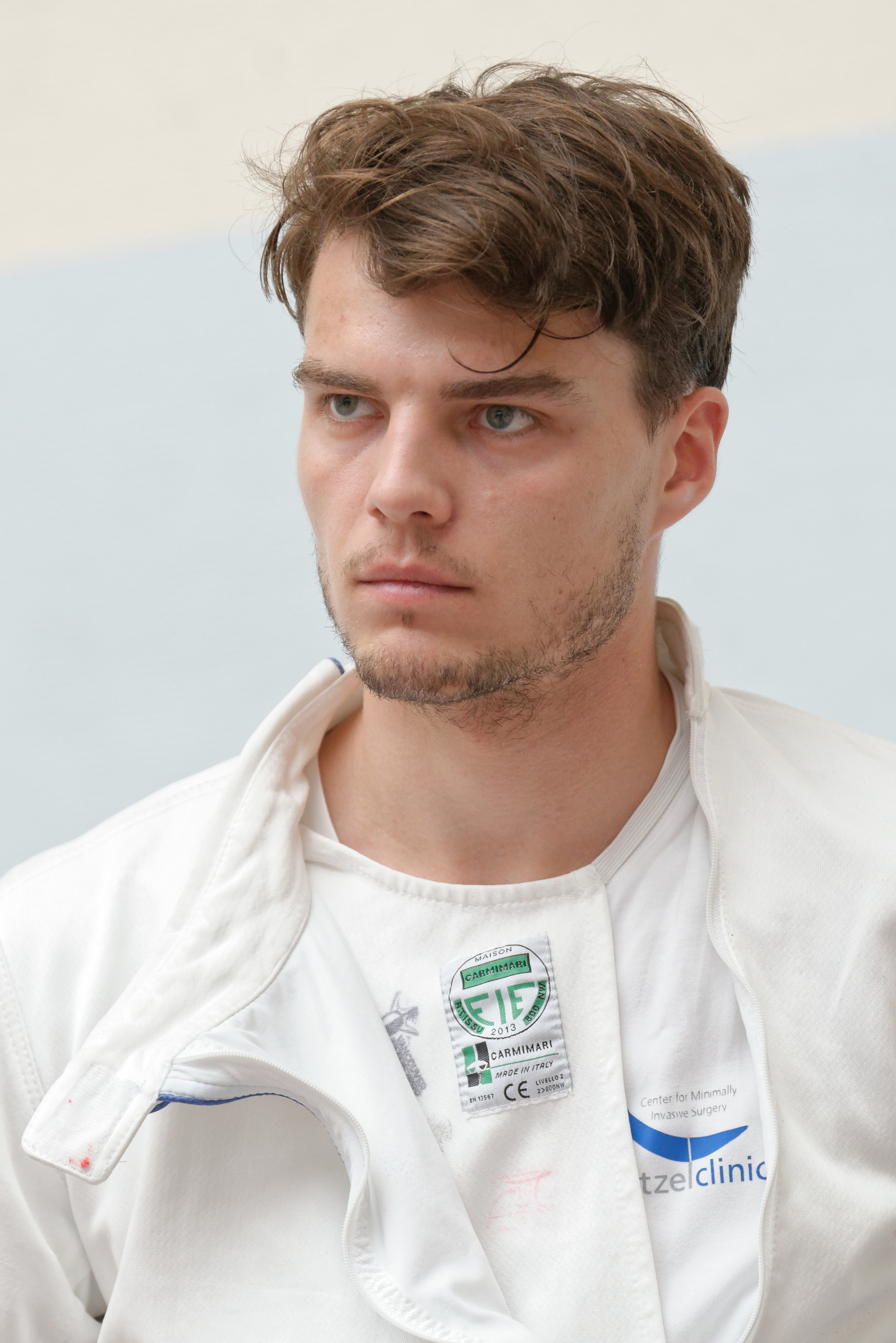

Personal information
- Nationality: Swiss
- Born: 5 November 1990 (age 35) Zürich, Switzerland
- Height: 1.92 m (6 ft 4 in)
- Weight: 78 kg (172 lb)

Fencing career
- Sport: Fencing
- Weapon: épée
- Hand: right-handed
- National coach: Gianni Muzio
- FIE ranking: current ranking
Medal record
World Championships
Bronze medal – third place	2014 Kazan	Team
Bronze medal – third place	2015 Moscow	Team
European Championships
Gold medal – first place	2014 Strasbourg	Team

Peer Borsky (born 5 November 1990) is a Swiss épée fencer, team bronze medallist in the 2014 World Fencing Championships and team European champion in the 2014 European Fencing Championships.

In the 2014–15 season Borsky climbed his first World Cup podium with a silver medal in the Doha Grand Prix.
