= Jan Bidovec =

Slovenian épée fencer

Personal information
- Nationality: Slovenian
- Born: 17 October 1989 (age 37)
- Home town: Zurich, Switzerland

Fencing career
- Sport: Fencing
- Weapon: épée
- Hand: right-handed
- Club: Fechtklub Bern
- FIE ranking: current ranking

Jan Bidovec (born 17 October 1989) is a Slovenian épée fencer.

== Biography ==
Jan Bidovec started fencing at 2000, in the fencing club Tabor Ljubljana, under the leadership of the famous coach Sergei Smirnovsky. From 2007 to present, Jan is a member of the Slovenian national fencing team. He is a multiple champion of Slovenia. In 2009, he achieved the best result in the history of Slovenian fencing: 7th place at the World Cup in Nîmes (France). In 2012 he reached the final table of 32 at the European Championships in Legnano (Italy), where he stumbled against Spain's Elias Casado. In the 2013–14 season he won the 1st place on FIE-satellite tournament (Belgrade, December 2013). In 2014 he graduated with a Diploma in Medicine from the University of Ljubljana and moved to Zurich, Switzerland to pursue medicine and trained in the Akademischer Fechtclub Zürich. He currently trains in the Fechtklub Bern and works as a Surgery Resident in Spital Thun. He also qualified for the final table of 64 in the 2014 World Championships in Kazan, but he lost by a single hit to 1988 Olympic bronze medallist José Luis Abajo.
