= Bartosz Piasecki =

Norwegian fencer (born 1986)

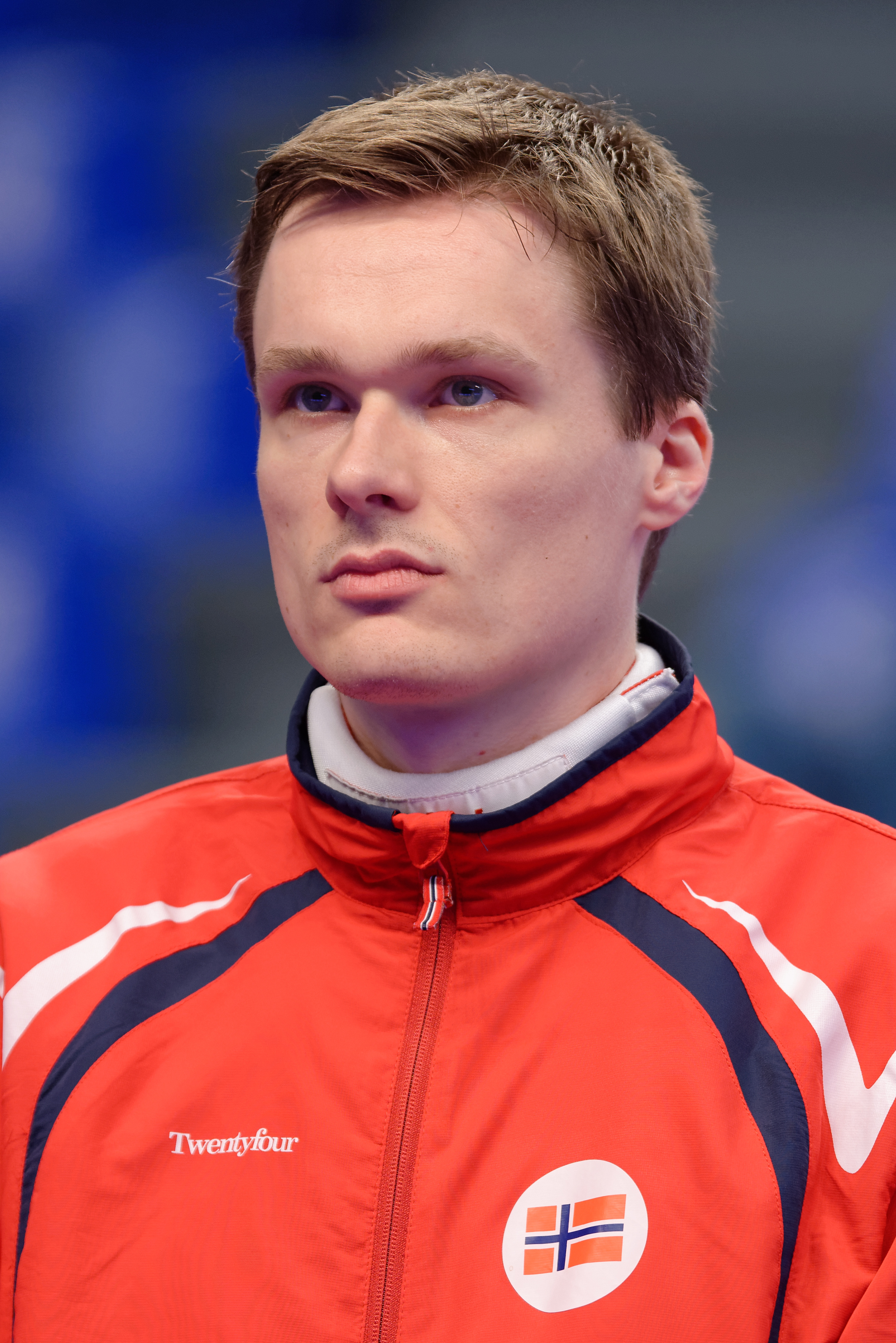
- Piasecki at Trophée Monal 2016

Personal information
- Nationality: Norwegian
- Born: 9 December 1986 (age 39) Tczew, Pomeranian Voivodeship, Poland
- Occupation: School teacher
- Height: 196 cm (77 in) (2012)
- Weight: 80 kg (176 lb) (2012)
- Website: www.bartoszpiasecki.com

Sport
- Country: Norway
- Sport: Fencing
- Club: Bygdø Fekteklubb
- Coached by: Mariusz Piasecki
Medal record
Representing Norway
Olympic Games
Silver medal – second place	2012 London	Individual épée
European Games
Bronze medal – third place	2015 Baku	Individual épée

Bartosz Piasecki (Norwegian pronunciation: [ˈbartɔʂ pjaˈsɛt͡skʲi]; born 9 December 1986) is a Norwegian fencer.

== Early life ==
Piasecki was born in Tczew in the Pomeranian Voivodeship, Poland but moved to Norway with his family when he was two years old. His father, Mariusz Piasecki is a fencing champion and coach who won 12 medals at the Polish Championships, and represented Poland at international competitions in the epee. Bartosz Piasecki holds a bachelor's degree in computer science from the University of Oslo.

== Career ==
He won the silver medal in the men's individual épée at the 2012 Summer Olympics in London. Piasecki lives in Bestum in Oslo and competes for Bygdø Fekteklubb. A right-hand fencer, Piasecki is coached by his father, Mariusz Piasecki, and works as a math teacher at the elite sports program at Wang Secondary School in Oslo.

Bartosz Piasecki earned a bronze medal during the U23 European Fencing Championship in Debrecen in 2009. In June 2012 he ended with a 16th position at the 2012 World Championship in Italy.

Piasecki's silver medal at the Olympics is Norway's best achievement in this discipline in history. The second best was an 11th place at the 1984 games by Nils Koppang.
