= Dmytro Karyuchenko =

Ukrainian épée fencer (born 1980)

Dmytro Kariuchenko
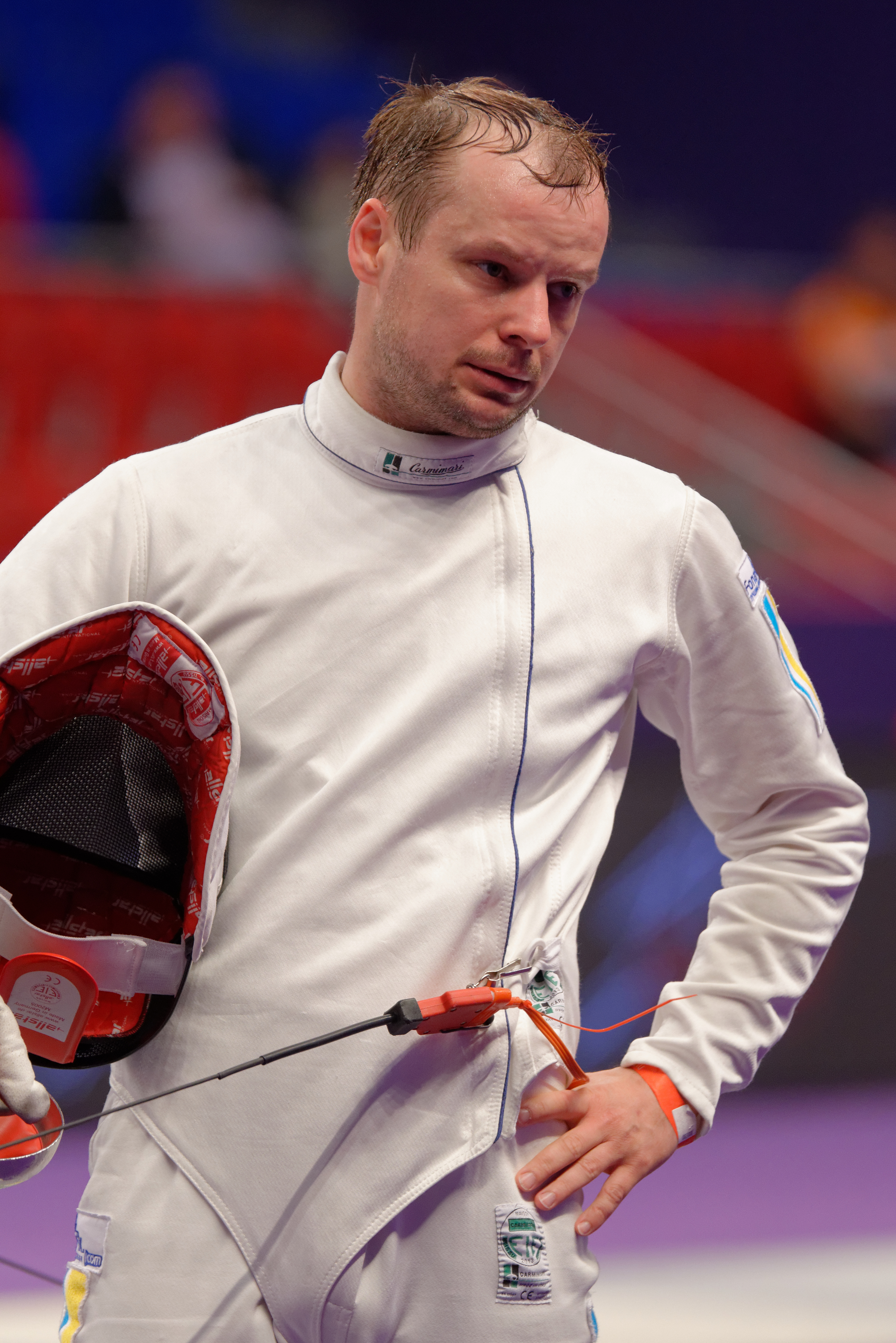

Personal information
- Nationality: Ukrainian
- Born: 15 January 1980 (age 46) Kharkiv, Ukrainian SSR, Soviet Union
- Height: 1.80 m (5 ft 11 in)
- Weight: 78 kg (172 lb)

Fencing career
- Sport: Fencing
- Weapon: Épée
- Hand: Right-handed
- FIE ranking: current ranking
Medal record
Men's épée fencing
Representing Ukraine
World Championships
Gold medal – first place	2015 Moscow	Team épée
Silver medal – second place	2013 Budapest	Team épée
Bronze medal – third place	2005 Leipzig	Team épée
Bronze medal – third place	2006 Turin	Team épée
European Championships
Gold medal – first place	2001 Coblenz	Team épée
Silver medal – second place	2003 Bourges	Team épée
Silver medal – second place	2010 Leipzig	Team épée
Bronze medal – third place	2012 Legnano	Team épée
Bronze medal – third place	2013 Zagreb	Team épée
Summer Universiade
Gold medal – first place	2003 Daegu	Team épée
Gold medal – first place	2005 Izmir	Team épée
Gold medal – first place	2007 Bangkok	Team épée

Dmytro Karyuchenko (Ukrainian: Дмитро Миколайович Карюченко; born 15 January 1980) is a Ukrainian épée fencer.

== Career ==
He was born in 1980 in Kharkov. Begin fencing in 1990 and was the first coach of the brother. Karyuchenko Igor

after the death of coach Episheva AS in September 1994 he moved to OdokienkoI.I and Averbeh L.V.

1995 at 15 years old won the Junior Championship of Ukraine, and in 1997 at the age of 17 years went to the national team for the first World Championships, Cape Town (South Africa)

member of the national team of Ukraine since 1997

1997 3rd place World Junior Championships individual Tenerife, Spain

1998 1st junior world champion Valencia, Venezuela individual

1999 2nd place World Junior Championships. Hungary, teams, 1st placeTeam European Championship juniors. Portugal

2000 3rd place World Junior Championships Team USA South Bemd

2001 1st place team European Championship in Leipzig, Germany

2002 3rd place team European Fencing Championship Moscow (Russia)

2003 1st place team 22nd Summer Universiade, Daegu, South Korea,

2003 2nd place team European Fencing Championship Bourges (France)

2004 participant of the Olympic Games in Athens

2005 1st place team 23rd World Summer Universiade Izmir

2005 3 place team World Championship in Leipzig, Germany

2006 3 place team World Championship in Turin, Italy

2007 1 place team 24th Summer Universiade in Bangkok, Thailand.

2010 2nd place team European Championship in Leipzig, Germany

2012 3rd place team European Championships in Legnano, Italy, participant of the Olympic Games in London.

2013 2nd place team World Championships in Budapest, Hungary

2013 3rd place team European Championships Zagreb, Croatia

2015 1st place team World Championships Moscow (Russia)

Individual victory at the World Cup

1st place 2012 World Cup in Legnano

1st place 2010 World Cup in Buenos Aires

1st place 2006 World Cup Lisbon

1st place 2006 World Cup Kuwait

The best result of the season

2nd place World Cup 2006 188points

Karuchenko won a bronze medal at the 1997 Junior World Fencing Championships in Tenerife and took the gold medal a year later in Valencia, Carabobo.

In the senior category, he climbed his first World Cup podium in the 2002–03 season with a silver medal in Sydney. A year later he took part in the 2004 Summer Olympics. He was defeated in the table of 16 by Germany's Daniel Strigel. In the team event, Ukraine lost to Hungary in the quarter-finals. Along with Dmytro Chumak, Maksym Khvorost and Bohdan Nikishyn, he earned the bronze medal in the épée team event of the 2006 World Fencing Championships after beating Hungary in the bronze medal match.

He graduated from the Kharkov Pedagogical University Law 1997–2002, 2002–2006 Faculty of Economics, Graduate School 2006–2009
