= Kim Won-jin (fencer) =

South Korean fencer (born 1984)

Personal information
- Born: August 24, 1984 (age 41) Seoul
- Home town: Seoul, Korea
- Height: 178 cm (5 ft 10 in)
- Weight: 76 kg (168 lb)

Fencing career
- Sport: Fencing
- Country: South Korea
- Weapon: Épée
- FIE ranking: Current ranking
Medal record
Asian Games
Gold medal – first place	2006	Team épée
Gold medal – first place	2010	Individual épée
Asian Fencing Championships
Gold medal – first place	2004	Individual épée
Bronze medal – third place	2005	Team épée
Gold medal – first place	2008	Individual épée

- Kim Won-jin
- Hangul: 김원진
- RR: Gim Wonjin
- MR: Kim Wŏnjin

Kim Won-jin (born August 24, 1984, Seoul) is a South Korean épée fencer who coaches at the Seoul Physical Education High School. Kim Won-jin has placed in the top eight at many international events, winning both the Asian Games and Asian Championships twice. He won the 2006 Asian Games in the men's individual épée. He says the inspirational figure in his life is Shim Jae-sung, another South Korean épéeist.

He fences left-handed and is 1.78 metres (5 ft 10 in) tall.
