= 2015 World Fencing Championships =

International fencing competition

- Dates: 13–19 July
- Host city: Moscow, Russia
- Venue: Olympic Stadium
- Nations participating: 108
- Athletes participating: 912
- Events: 12

The 2015 World Fencing Championships were held at the Olympic Stadium in Moscow, Russia from 13 to 19 July 2015.

== Schedule ==
The schedule of the competition.

●	Opening Ceremony	Q	Qualifying	●	Finals	●	Closing Ceremony

July	13	14	15	16	17	18	19	Total
Ceremonies		●					●	
Foil Individual			Q	2				2
Sabre Individual	Q	2						2
Épée Individual		Q	2					2
Foil Team						Q	2	2
Sabre Team				Q	2			2
Épée Team					Q	2		2
Total Gold Medals	0	2	2	2	2	2	2	12

== Medal summary ==
=== Medal table ===
* Host nation (Russia)

Rank	Nation	Gold	Silver	Bronze	Total
1	Russia (RUS)*	4	4	1	9
2	Italy (ITA)	4	0	1	5
3	Ukraine (UKR)	1	1	1	3
4	China (CHN)	1	0	3	4
5	Hungary (HUN)	1	0	1	2
6	Japan (JPN)	1	0	0	1
7	United States (USA)	0	2	3	5
8	France (FRA)	0	2	1	3
9	Romania (ROU)	0	1	1	2
9	South Korea (KOR)	0	1	1	2
11	Sweden (SWE)	0	1	0	1
12	Germany (GER)	0	0	2	2
13	Denmark (DEN)	0	0	1	1
13	Switzerland (SUI)	0	0	1	1
13	Tunisia (TUN)	0	0	1	1
Totals (15 entries)		12	12	18	42

=== Men's events ===
Event	Gold	Silver	Bronze
Individual épée	Géza Imre (HUN)	Gauthier Grumier (FRA)	Jung Seung-hwa (KOR); Patrick Jørgensen (DEN)
Team épée	Ukraine; Anatoliy Herey; Dmytro Karyuchenko; Maksym Khvorost; Bohdan Nikishyn	South Korea; Jung Seung-hwa; Kweon Young-jun; Na Jong-kwan; Park Kyoung-doo	Switzerland; Peer Borsky; Max Heinzer; Fabian Kauter; Benjamin Steffen
Individual foil	Yuki Ota (JPN)	Alexander Massialas (USA)	Artur Akhmatkhuzin (RUS); Gerek Meinhardt (USA)
Team foil	Italy; Giorgio Avola; Andrea Baldini; Andrea Cassarà; Daniele Garozzo	Russia; Artur Akhmatkhuzin; Aleksey Cheremisinov; Renal Ganeyev; Dmitry Rigin	China; Chen Haiwei; Lei Sheng; Ma Jianfei; Li Chen
Individual sabre	Aleksey Yakimenko (RUS)	Daryl Homer (USA)	Tiberiu Dolniceanu (ROU); Max Hartung (GER)
Team sabre	Italy; Enrico Berrè; Luca Curatoli; Aldo Montano; Diego Occhiuzzi	Russia; Kamil Ibragimov; Nikolay Kovalev; Veniamin Reshetnikov; Aleksey Yakimenko	Germany; Max Hartung; Nicolas Limbach; Matyas Szabo; Benedikt Wagner

=== Women's events ===
Event	Gold	Silver	Bronze
Individual épée	Rossella Fiamingo (ITA)	Emma Samuelsson (SWE)	Sarra Besbes (TUN); Xu Anqi (CHN)
Team épée	China; Hao Jialu; Sun Yujie; Sun Yiwen; Xu Anqi	Romania; Ana Maria Brânză; Loredana Dinu; Simona Gherman; Simona Pop	Ukraine; Olena Kryvytska; Kseniya Pantelyeyeva; Anfisa Pochkalova; Yana Shemyakina
Individual foil	Inna Deriglazova (RUS)	Aida Shanayeva (RUS)	Arianna Errigo (ITA); Nzingha Prescod (USA)
Team foil	Italy; Martina Batini; Elisa Di Francisca; Arianna Errigo; Valentina Vezzali	Russia; Yuliya Biryukova; Inna Deriglazova; Larisa Korobeynikova; Aida Shanayeva	France; Anita Blaze; Astrid Guyart; Pauline Ranvier; Ysaora Thibus
Individual sabre	Sofiya Velikaya (RUS)	Cécilia Berder (FRA)	Shen Chen (CHN); Anna Márton (HUN)
Team sabre	Russia; Yekaterina Dyachenko; Yana Egorian; Yuliya Gavrilova; Sofiya Velikaya	Ukraine; Olha Kharlan; Alina Komashchuk; Olena Kravatska; Olena Voronina	United States; Ibtihaj Muhammad; Anne-Elizabeth Stone; Dagmara Wozniak; Mariel Zagunis
