= Dmitriy Alexanin =

Kazakhstani fencer (born 1991)

Dmitriy Aleksanin
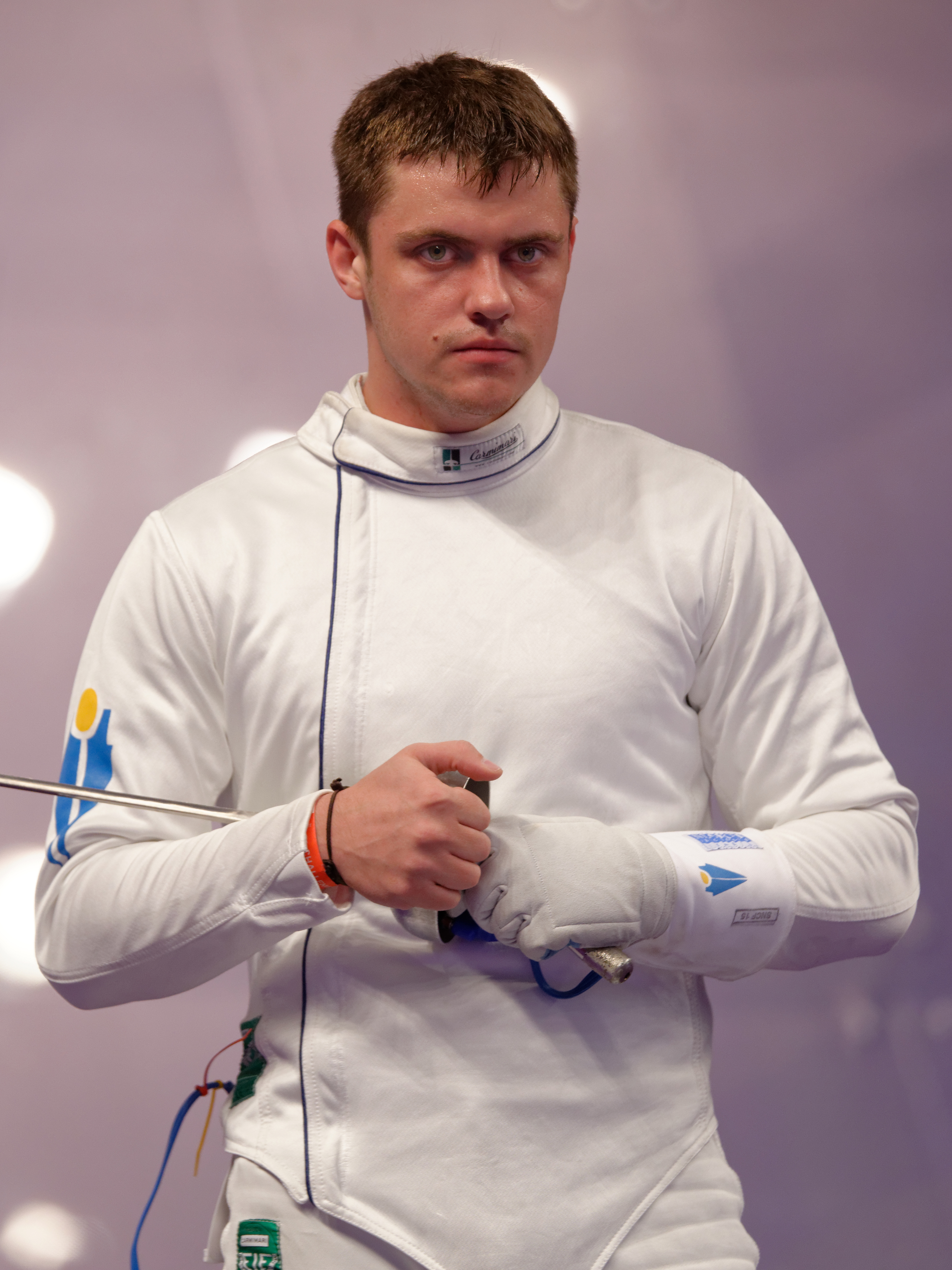

Personal information
- Born: 18 December 1991 (age 34) Alma Ata, Kazakhstan
- Height: 1.84 m (6 ft 0 in)
- Weight: 86 kg (190 lb)

Fencing career
- Sport: Fencing
- Country: Kazakhstan
- Weapon: épée
- Hand: left-handed
- National coach: Valery Dimov
- FIE ranking: current ranking
Medal record
Representing Kazakhstan
Men's Épée
Asian Games
Gold medal – first place	2018 Jakarta-Palembang	Individual épée
Bronze medal – third place	2014 Incheon	Team épée
Bronze medal – third place	2018 Jakarta-Palembang	Team épée
Asian Championships
Gold medal – first place	2013 Shanghai	Team épée
Silver medal – second place	2012 Wakayama	Team épée

Dmitriy Sergeevich Alexanin (Kazakh: Дмитрий Сергеевич Алексанин; born 18 December 1991) is a Kazakhstani épée fencer, team gold medallist at the 2014 Asian Championships and team bronze medallist at the 2014 Asian Games. Alexanin later went on to win a gold medal (individual) at the 2018 Asian Games.

== Career ==
Alexanin began fencing in 2002 at the instigation of his mother. His first coach was Igor Yarmolkevich. He was then placed under the responsibility of national épée coach Valery Dimov. He made his international debut in the 2010–11 season at the Legnano World Cup. A year later, he won the bronze at the Trophée Monal.

At the 2012 Summer Olympics he competed in the Men's épée, but was defeated in the first round by Silvio Fernández. He won a team bronze medal with Kazakhstan at the 2013 Summer Universiade. He reached the quarter-finals in the individual event and won a team gold medal at the 2013 Asian Fencing Championships in Shanghai. At the 2013 World Fencing Championships in Budapest he reached again the quarter-finals, where he was defeated by Estonia's Nikolai Novosjolov who eventually won the gold medal. Alexanin finished the 2013–14 season No.25, a career best.

His gold medal at the 2018 Asian Games was the first gold won by a Kazakh fencer. That year, the Kazakh National Olympic Committee named him "Best Athlete of the Year in Summer Sports".

Alexanin studied at the Kazakh Academy of Sports and Tourism. His elder brother Sergey is also a fencer.
