= Jung Seung-hwa =

South Korean fencer (born 1981)

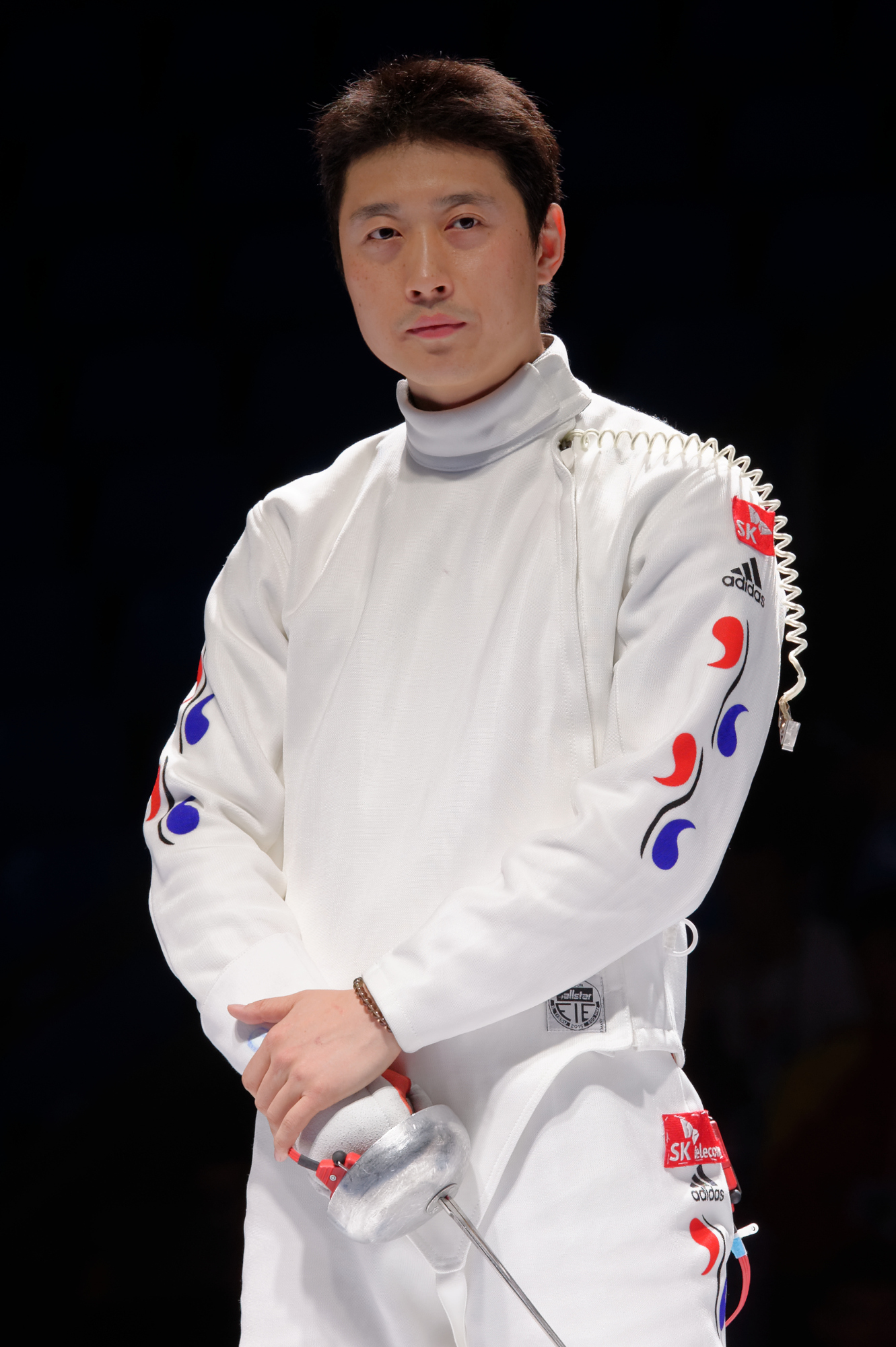

Personal information
- Born: 27 March 1981 (age 45)

Fencing career
- Sport: Fencing
- Weapon: épée
- Hand: right-handed
- National coach: Jo Hui-je
- Club: Busan Metropolitan City
- FIE ranking: current ranking
Medal record
Men's épée
Representing South Korea
World Championships
Silver medal – second place	2015 Moscow	Team
Bronze medal – third place	2015 Moscow	Individual

- Jung Seung-hwa
- Hangul: 정승화
- RR: Jeong Seunghwa
- MR: Chŏng Sŭnghwa

Jung Seung-hwa (Korean: 정승화; Korean pronunciation: [tɕʌŋ.sɯŋ.ɦwa]; born 27 March 1981) is a South Korean épée fencer, individual bronze medallist and team silver medallist at the 2015 World Fencing Championships. With the South Korean team he was also gold medallist at the 2010 Asian Games.
