= Serguei Katchiourine =

Kyrgyzstani fencer (born 1973)

Personal information
- Full name: Serguei Petrovich Katchiourine
- Nationality: Kyrgyzstan
- Born: 29 August 1973
- Died: 23 October 2020 (aged 47)
- Height: 1.74 m (5 ft 8 1/2 in)
- Weight: 80 kg (176 lb)

Sport
- Sport: Fencing
- Event: Épée

Serguei Petrovich Katchiourine (Russian: Серге́й Петрович Качурин; August 29, 1973 – October 23, 2020) was a Kyrgyzstani épée fencer. At age thirty-four, Katchiourine made his official debut for the 2008 Summer Olympics in Beijing, where he competed in the individual épée event. He lost the first preliminary match to France's Fabrice Jeannet, with a score of 14–15.
