= Leung Ka Ming =

Hong Kong fencer

Leung Ka Ming (Chinese: 梁嘉明; Jyutping: loeng^{4} gaa^{1} ming^{4}, born 19 December 1988, Hong Kong) is a Hong Kong fencer. At the 2012 Summer Olympics, he competed in the Men's épée but was defeated in the first round by Paolo Pizzo.
