= Dong Chao (fencer) =

Chinese fencer (born 1988)

Personal information
- Nationality: Chinese
- Born: February 5, 1988 (age 38) Beijing

Sport
- Country: China
- Sport: Fencing
- Event: épée
Medal record
Men's Fencing
Representing China
Summer Universiade
Gold medal – first place	2013 Kazhan	individual men's épée
Silver medal – second place	2013 Kazhan	team épée
Asian Fencing Championships
Gold medal – first place	2018 Bangkok	team épée
Gold medal – first place	2019 Chiba	team épée
Silver medal – second place	2014 Suwon	team épée
Silver medal – second place	2015 Singapore	team épée
Bronze medal – third place	2016 Wuzi	team épée
Asian Games
Silver medal – second place	2018 Jakarta	team épée
Bronze medal – third place	2010 Guangzhou	team épée
World Cup
Bronze medal – third place	2014 Tallinn	individual men's épée

Dong Chao (born 5 February 1988) is a Chinese fencer.

== Career ==
Dong represented China at the 2010 Asian Games which also marked his maiden appearance at the Asian Games. During the 2010 Asian Games, he claimed a bronze medal in the team épée event. He also clinched bronze medal at the 2013–14 Fencing World Cup.

He represented China at the 2020 Summer Olympics which also marked his debut appearance at the Olympics. During the 2020 Summer Olympics, he competed in the men's épée event.
