= Ruslan Kudayev =

Uzbekistani fencer (born 1980)

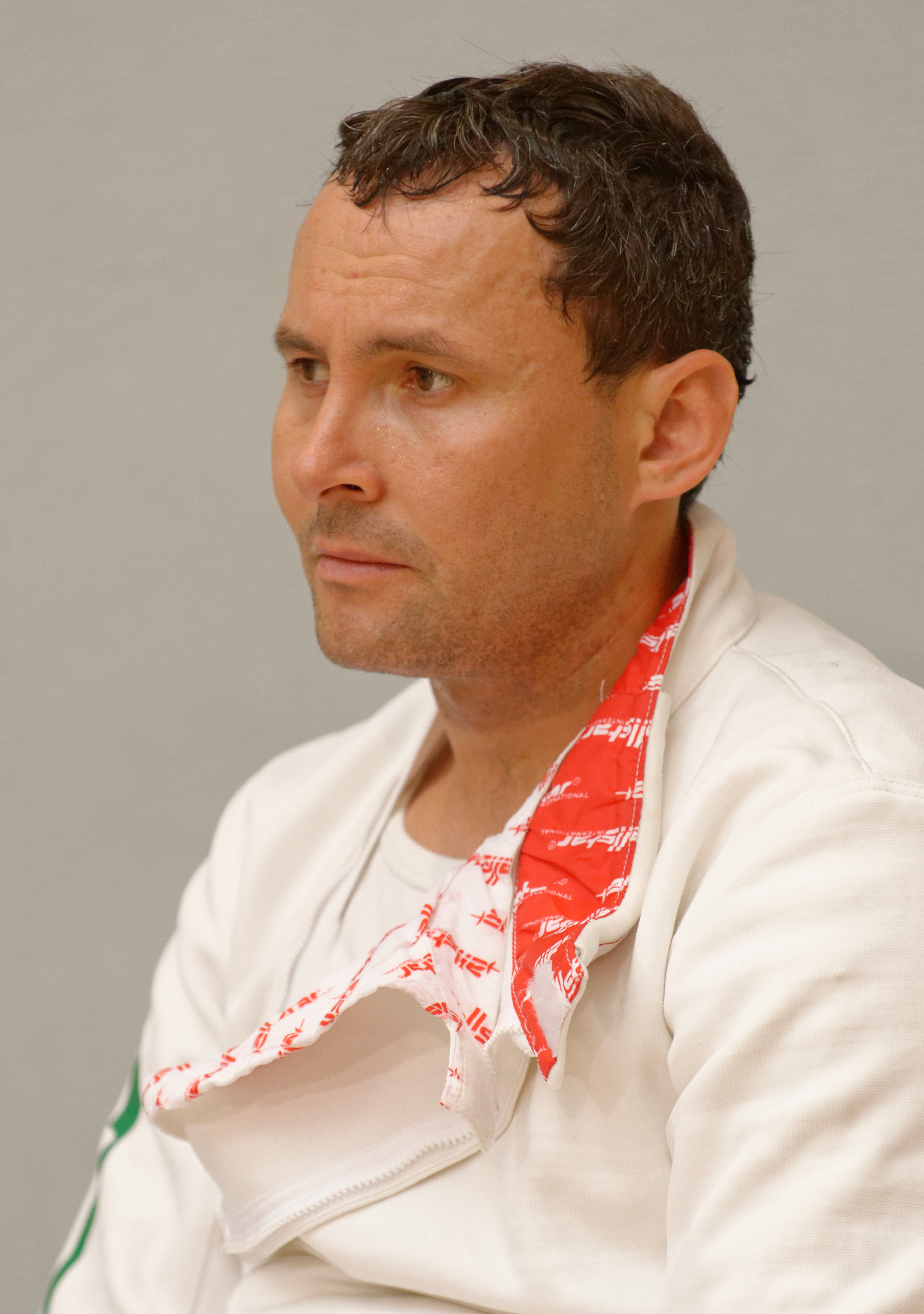

Personal information
- Born: 15 January 1980 (age 46) Andijan Province, Uzbekistan
- Height: 1.84 m (6 ft 0 in)
- Weight: 70 kg (150 lb)

Fencing career
- Sport: Fencing
- Weapon: Épée
- Hand: left-handed
- FIE ranking: current ranking

Ruslan Kudayev (born 8 May 1980 in Andijan Province) is an Uzbekistani fencer.

He qualified in men's épée at the 2012 Summer Olympics as one of the three top finishers of the Asia-Oceania qualifying tournament. He defeated South Korea's Park Kyoung-doo in the table of 32, but lost to Venezuela's Silvio Fernández in the next round.
