= Li Guojie (fencer) =

Chinese fencer

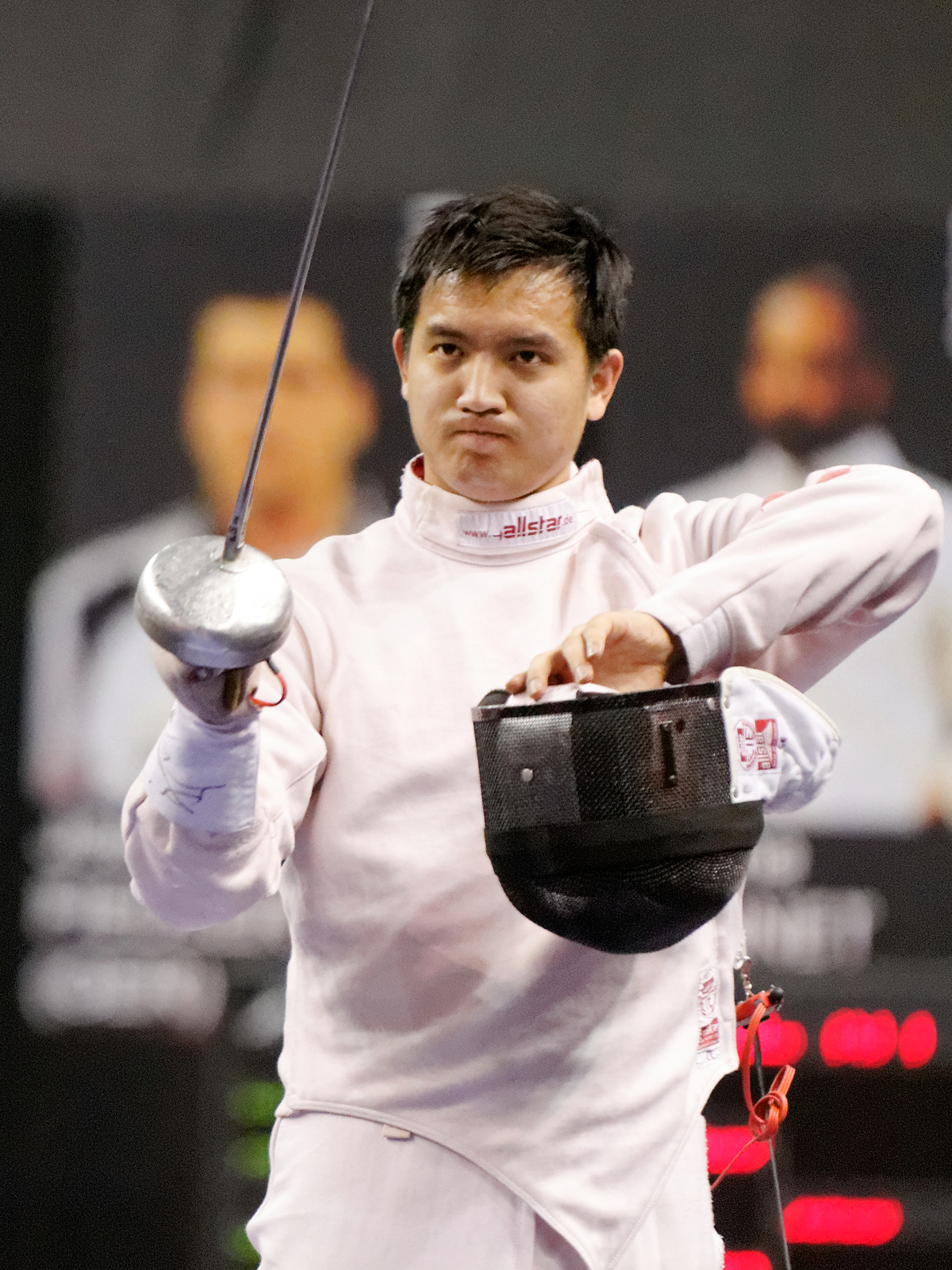
- Li at Trophée Monal 2012
- Born: 15 October 1985 (age 40); Chengdu, Sichuan

Li Guojie (born 15 October 1985 in Chengdu, Sichuan) is a Chinese épée fencer, who competed at the 2008 Summer Olympics and the 2012 Summer Olympics.

At the 2008 Summer Olympics, he was part of the Chinese épée team that finished in 4th place, narrowly losing the semi-final to Poland 44–45, and the bronze medal match 35–45.

== Major performances ==
- 2006 National Championships – 1st épée
- 2008 Asian Fencing Championships - 3rd épée
- 2010 Asian Games (Guangzhou) – 2nd épée
- 2011 Asian Fencing Championships - 3rd épée
- 2012 Asian Fencing Championships - 3rd épée
- 2013 Asian Fencing Championships - 3rd épée

== See also ==
- China at the 2008 Summer Olympics
