= Park Kyoung-doo =

South Korean fencer (born 1984)

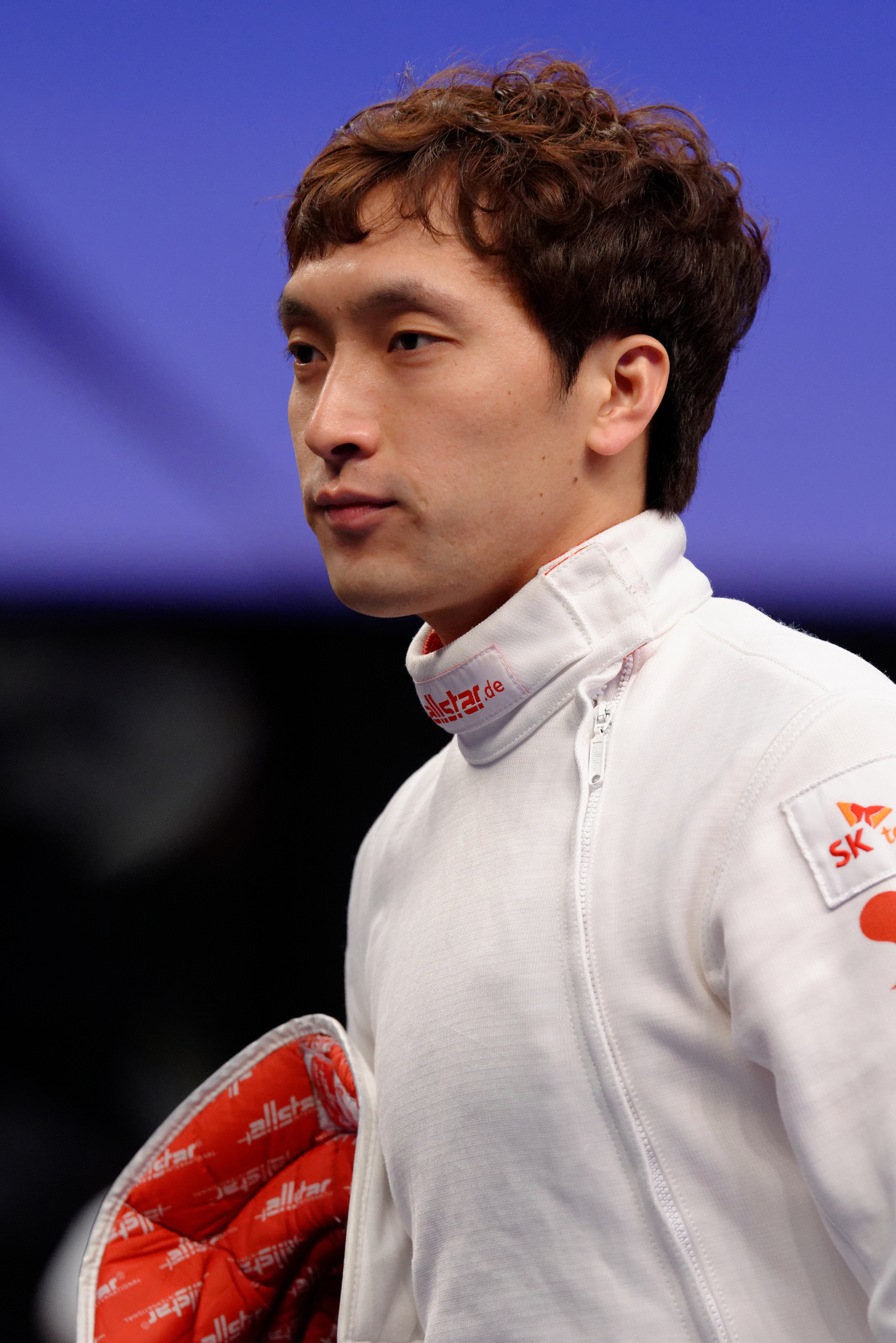
- Park at Trophée Monal 2014

Personal information
- Nationality: South Korean
- Born: 3 August 1984 (age 42) Haenam, South Korea
- Height: 1.76 m (5 ft 9 in)
- Weight: 76 kg (168 lb)

Fencing career
- Sport: Fencing
- Country: South Korea
- Weapon: Épée
- Hand: right-handed
- National coach: Cho Hee-jae
- FIE ranking: current ranking
Medal record
World Championships
| Silver medal – second place | 2014 Kazan | Individual |
| Silver medal – second place | 2014 Kazan | Team |
| Silver medal – second place | 2015 Moscow | Team |
| Silver medal – second place | 2018 Wuxi | Team |
| Bronze medal – third place | 2011 Catania | Individual |
Asian Games
| Gold medal – first place | 2010 Guangzhou | Team |
| Gold medal – first place | 2014 Incheon | Team |
| Silver medal – second place | 2014 Incheon | Individual |
Asian Championships
| Gold medal – first place | 2009 Doha | Individual |
| Gold medal – first place | 2009 Doha | Team |
| Gold medal – first place | 2010 Seoul | Team |
| Gold medal – first place | 2011 Seoul | Team |

- Park Kyoung-doo
- Hangul: 박경두
- RR: Bak Gyeongdu
- MR: Pak Kyŏngdu

Park Kyoung-doo (Korean pronunciation: [pak̚.k͈jʌŋ.du] or [pak̚] [kjʌŋ.du]; born 3 August 1984) is a South Korean right-handed épée fencer, four-time team Asian champion, 2016 individual Asian champion, and two-time Olympian.

Park competed in the 2012 London Olympic Games and the 2016 Rio de Janeiro Olympic Games.

== Medal record ==
=== World championship ===
| Year | Location | Event | Position |
|---|---|---|---|
| 2011 | Catania, Italy | Individual men's épée | 3rd |
| 2014 | Kazan, Russia | Individual men's épée | 2nd |
| 2014 | Kazan, Russia | Team men's dpée | 2nd |
| 2015 | Moscow, Russia | Team men's épée | 2nd |
| 2018 | Wuxi, China | Team men's épée | 2nd |

=== Asian Championship ===
| Year | Location | Event | Position |
|---|---|---|---|
| 2010 | Seoul, South Korea | Individual men's épée | 3rd |
| 2010 | Seoul, South Korea | Team Men's Épée | 1st |
| 2011 | Seoul, South Korea | Individual men's épée | 3rd |
| 2011 | Seoul, South Korea | Team men's épée | 1st |
| 2014 | Suwon City, South Korea | Individual men's épée | 3rd |
| 2014 | Suwon City, South Korea | Team men's épée | 1st |
| 2015 | Singapore | Individual men's épée | 2nd |
| 2016 | Wuxi, China | Individual men's épée | 1st |
| 2016 | Wuxi, China | Team men's épée | 2nd |
| 2017 | Hong Kong, China | Individual men's épée | 3rd |
| 2017 | Hong Kong, China | Team men's épée | 1st |

=== Grand Prix ===
| Date | Location | Event | Position |
|---|---|---|---|
| 02/10/2012 | Doha, Qatar | Individual men's épée | 1st |
| 04/22/2016 | Rio de Janeiro, Brazil | Individual men's épée | 3rd |
| 03/24/2017 | Budapest, Hungary | Individual men's épée | 3rd |
| 05/26/2017 | Bogotá, Colombia | Individual men's épée | 3rd |

=== World Cup ===
| Date | Location | Event | Position |
|---|---|---|---|
| 01/26/2017 | Heidenheim, Germany | Individual men's épée | 1st |
| 05/11/2018 | Paris, France | Individual Men's Épée | 3rd |
