= Spanish Costa Rican =

Spanish-Costa Rican Hispano-Costarricense
Total population
- 4,726,001 (est.) (Counting a possible 75% of descendants of Spaniards, and 17% of mestizos, although 80% are of European descent)

Regions with significant populations
- All Costa Rica

Languages
- Costa Rican Spanish

Religion
- Roman Catholicism and Protestantism

Related ethnic groups
- Costa Rican people, Spanish people, White Costa Rican

Spanish Costa Rican are people from Costa Rica with Spanish ancestry from both the conquerors of the colonial period and as immigrants who arrived after independence and the Central American Federation of disunion. Historically this part of the population was called Criollo and were privileged but did not have equal rights with the Spaniards, some of them were mixed with Mestizos. Approximately 16,482 Spanish citizens were living in Costa Rica in 2009.

== Immigration ==
The Spanish immigration began with the exploration of Hernán Ponce de León and Juan de Castañeda along the Pacific coast, soon after led to the native population of this region under Spanish control. Although a small number of colonists settled in Costa Rica because of the small number of Indians who inhabited the region. After independence, the governors were interested in populating the territories with white workers, preferably imported from Europe. After independence, the governors were interested in populating territories with white people workers, preferably brought from Europe, banana cultivation was attracting a lot of capital and labor for the construction of the railway to the Atlantic.

=== Catalan Immigration ===
In the early twentieth century many Spaniards used Costa Rica as a bridge to move to Panama attracted by the construction of the Canal. The events in Catalonia for the same dates Catalan prompted many to migrate to Costa Rica, becoming in a few years a thriving and influential Catalan colony that persists today. This colony, located in San Jose (Costa Rica) came to consist mainly of Catalan, followed by Gallegos, Asturian and Castilian. Currently the Catalans make up most of the community of Spaniards in Costa Rica.

=== Canarian Immigration ===
Some Canarians had already settled in Costa Rica, beginning in the 16th century; a Canarian from Lanzarote island, Jose Martinez, was among the first Spanish settlers to arrive in Costa Rica in the 16th century. But large-scale Canarian immigration took place in 1884, when over 8,000 Canarians emigrated to a small town when the Costa Rican government invited Canarian immigration to populate the uninhabited town.

=== migration flows ===
census year	immigrants
1864	41
1886	68
1892	1,033
1927	2,527

== Costa Ricans of Spanish ancestry ==
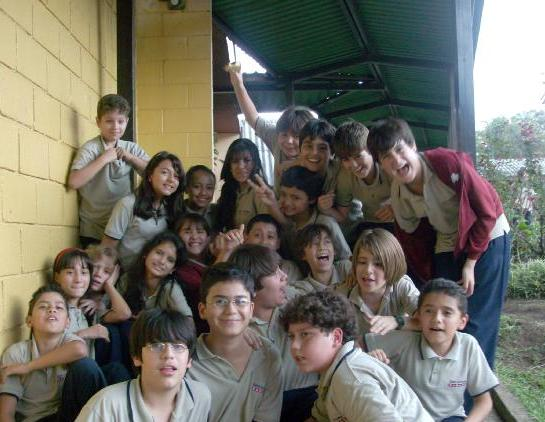
Costa Rican children at a Costa Rican School. Note that many have Hispanic features.

The mark on the Spanish in Costa Rican society is very large so much ethnic and cultural, about 80% of the white population is overwhelmingly of Spanish origin, and 17% of the population is mestizo (Spanish with native). According to a genetic study called "Geographic Patterns of Genome Admixture in Latin American Mestizos" the most comprehensive study of mestizo populations of Latin America and published in 2008 in the journal PLoS Genetics, and in which participated the School of Biology, University of Costa Rica, the average resident of the Central Valley of Costa Rica has 65% of European genes (42.5% Spaniards), 30% native and 5% African population. In total the Spaniards contributed very largely on the genetics of Costa Ricans, being the Spanish and mestizo place greater weight in the nation (90%), other European (7%), Chinese, blacks and Arabs (2%) and communities Indians (1%).

=== Notable Spanish Costa Ricans ===
This list includes notable Costa Ricans who are part-Spanish or Spanish descendant, this takes into account those who have certain inherited Spanish blood from mestizos and lineal descendants.

- Juan Rafael Mora Porras, former president
- José Figueres Ferrer, former president
- Jorge Arroyo, playwright
- Víctor Cañas, architect, former diplomat
- Walter Flores, musician, director
- Ricardo Jiménez Oreamuno, liberal politic
- Rafael Ángel García, artist, architect
- Federico Tinoco Granados, former president, army general
- Aquileo J. Echeverría, politician, author, journalist
- Juan Bernal Ponce, architect
- Tomás Povedano, painter

== Spanish Associations in Costa Rica ==
The Spaniards apart from the genetic make Costa Ricans have contributed to the culture of Costa Rica as associations and cultural centers, most are in San Jose.

- Spain Costa RicaEmbajada de España en Costa Rica.
- Ministerio de Empleo y Seguridad Social en Costa Rica.
- Asociación Española de Beneficencia.
- Casal Catalá.
- Club Campestre Español.
- Lar Gallego.
- Comunidad Catalana de San José.
- Centro Cultural de España en San José de Costa Rica.
- Centro Asturiano de Costa Rica.
- Hotel Centro Gallego.
- Colegio Hispanocostarricense "Calasanz".
- Oficina Técnica de Cooperación.
- Barrio Escalante.
- Plaza del Farolito.
- Cooperación Educativa.

== See also ==
- Costa Rica–Spain relations
- Spanish diaspora
- Demographics of Costa Rica
