= Sven Järve =

Estonian épée fencer

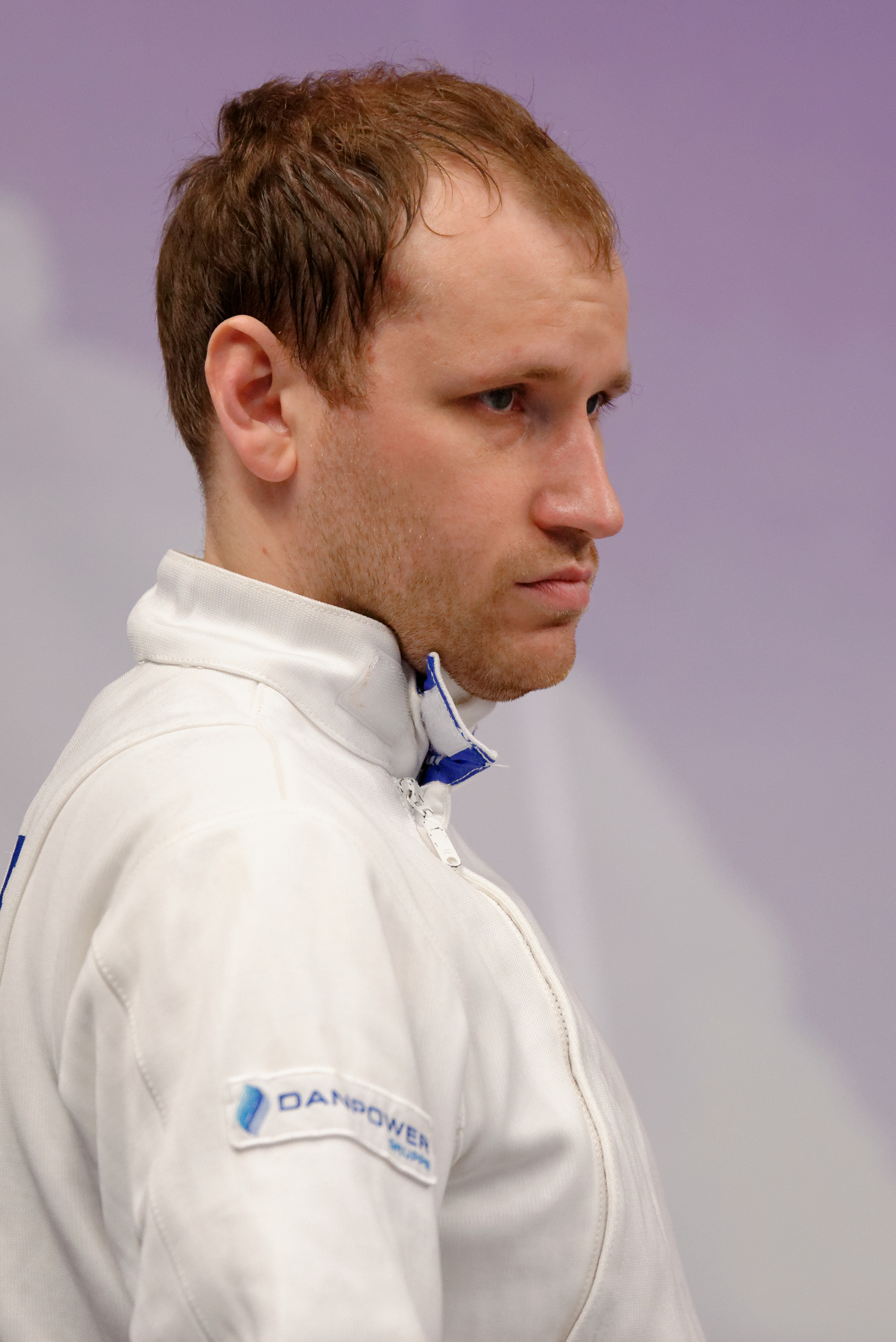
- Järve at the 2014 Paris World Cup

Personal information
- Nationality: Estonia
- Born: 25 July 1980 (age 45) Tallinn, then part of Estonian SSR, Soviet Union
- Height: 1.83 m (6 ft 0 in)
- Weight: 90 kg (198 lb)

Fencing career
- Sport: Fencing
- Weapon: épée
- Hand: left-handed
- FIE ranking: current ranking
Medal record
World Championships
Bronze medal – third place	2006 Torino	Men's epée

Sven Järve (born 25 July 1980) is an Estonian épée fencer.

Jarve won the bronze medal at the épée 2006 World Fencing Championships after he lost 15–12 to Joaquim Videira in the semi-final.

== Achievements ==
2006 World Fencing Championships, épée

== Record Against Selected Opponents ==
Includes results from 2006–present and athletes who have reached the quarterfinals of the World Championships or Olympic Games, plus fencers who have received medals in major team competitions.

- (Hungary) Gábor Boczkó 1–0
- (Italy) Alfredo Rota 1–1
- (Portugal) Joaquim Videira 0–1
- (Poland) Robert Andrzejuk 0–1
- (France) Érik Boisse 1–2
- (Spain) Ignacio Canto 2–2
- (Italy) Stefano Carozzo 0–2
- (Venezuela) Silvio Fernández 0–1
- (Hungary) Krisztián Kulcsár 1–0
- (France) Ulrich Robeiri 0–1
- (Belarus) Vitaly Zakharov 2–1
- (Spain) Jose Luis Abajo 0–3
- (Italy) Diego Confalonieri 0–1
- (France) Fabrice Jeannet 1–0
- (Russia) Pavel Kolobkov 1–1
- (Italy) Matteo Tagliariol 0–2
- (Russia) Anton Avdeev 0–1
- (France) Jérôme Jeannet 1–0
