= José Luis Abajo =

Spanish fencer (born 1978)

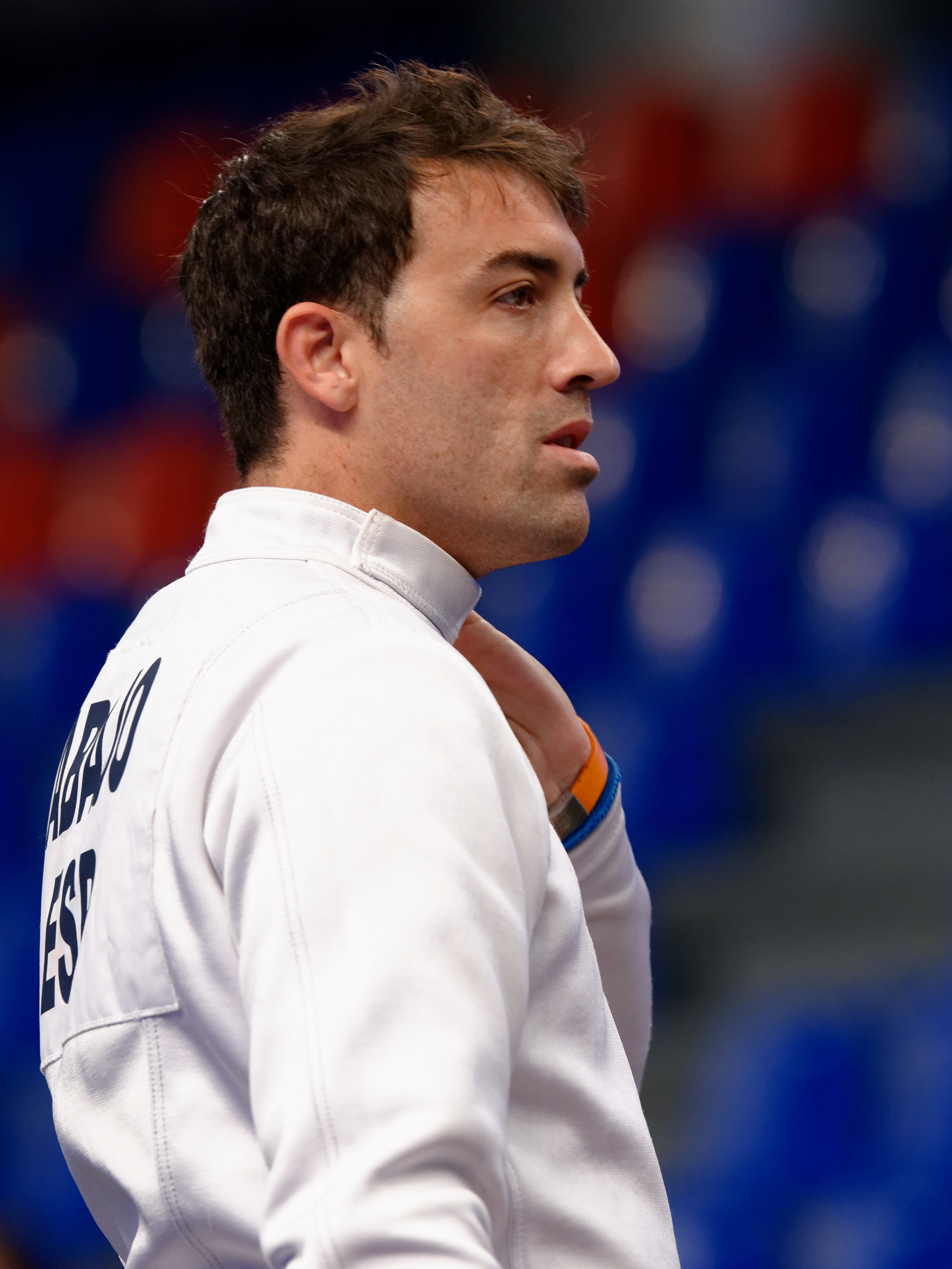
- Abajo at the 2014 Paris World Cup

Personal information
- Full name: José Luis Abajo Gómez
- Born: 22 June 1978 (age 48) Madrid, Spain
- Height: 1.97 m (6 ft 5 1/2 in)
- Weight: 87 kg (192 lb; 13.7 st)

Fencing career
- Sport: Fencing
- Country: Spain
- Weapon: Épée
- Hand: Right-handed
- Club: Sala de Armas Madrid
- FIE ranking: current ranking
Medal record
Men's Fencing
Representing Spain
Olympic Games
Bronze medal – third place	2008 Beijing	Epée
World Championships
Silver medal – second place	2006 Turin	Team Épée
Bronze medal – third place	2009 Antalya	Épée
European Championships
Silver medal – second place	2000 Funchal	Team Épée
Silver medal – second place	2014 Strasbourg	Team Épée
Mediterranean Games
Silver medal – second place	2001 Tunisia	Team Épée
Bronze medal – third place	2005 Almeria	Épée
Bronze medal – third place	2013 Mersin	Épée

José Luis Abajo Gómez (born 22 June 1978) is a Spanish épée fencer.

Abajo won the silver medal in the épée team event at the 2006 World Fencing Championships after losing against France in the final. He accomplished this with his teammates Ignacio Canto, Juan Castañeda and Eduardo Sepulveda Puerto.

He won the bronze medal in the Épée competition at the 2008 Summer Olympics in Beijing, China, defeating Hungarian Gábor Boczkó. Being this the first Olympic medal won by Spain in fencing, and becoming the Olympic medal number 100 (99 according to the IOC) in the history of Spain, regarding Winter and Summer Olympics.

In 2013 he was inducted in the Hall of Fame of the International Fencing Federation.

He won his 1st Medal at the 2000 European Championships in Funchal, Maderia

== Record Against Selected Opponents ==
Includes results from all competitions 2006–present and athletes who have reached the quarterfinals at the World Championships or Olympic Games, plus those who have medaled in major team competitions.

- (Portugal) Joaquim Videira 3–1
- (France) Ulrich Robeiri 0–1
- (Hungary) Gábor Boczkó 1–3
- (Italy) Stefano Carozzo 2–0
- (Ukraine) Maksym Khvorost 1–1
- (Italy) Alfredo Rota 2–0
- (Italy) Matteo Tagliariol 0–2
- (Netherlands) Bas Verwijlen 1–1
- (Italy) Diego Confalonieri 1–1
- (Estonia) Sven Järve 3–0
- (France) Fabrice Jeannet 0–1
- (Russia) Anton Avdeev 0–1
- (Venezuela) Silvio Fernandez 1–0
- (Cuba) Guillermo Madrigal Sardinas 1–0
- (Poland) Radosław Zawrotniak 0-1

== Achievements ==
2006 World Fencing Championships, team épée
