= Immigration to Costa Rica =

Total foreign population 2012
Place	Country	Numbers
1	Nicaragua	287 766
2	Colombia	16 514
3	United States	15 898
4	Panama	11 250
5	El Salvador	9 424
6	Venezuela	3 886
7	Cuba	3 860
8	Honduras	3 778
9	Peru	3 404
10	China	3 281
11	Mexico	3 059
12	Guatemala	2 573
13	Spain	1 806
14	Argentina	1 786
15	Canada	1 679
16	Italy	1 494
17	Dominican Republic	1 475
18	Germany	1 412
19	Chile	1 364
20	Ecuador	1 040
21	France	936
22	Taiwan	797
23	Brazil	605
24	Switzerland	551
25	England	503
26	Netherlands	434
27	Russia	429
28	Uruguay	356
29	Bolivia	331
30	South Korea	263
31	Belgium	254
32	Puerto Rico	245

At the 2011 census, the number of immigrants in Costa Rica totaled about 390,000 individuals, or about 9% of the country's population. Following a considerable drop from 1950 through 1980, immigration to Costa Rica has increased in recent decades.

The ethnic composition of Costa Rica consists mostly of people of European and Mestizo origin and also black and indigenous people.

== Social impact ==
Immigration to Costa Rica has caused some social problems. Although most people enter the country to seek better employment opportunities, some immigrants have been involved in criminal activities. The government of Costa Rica has tried to stop the illegal immigration of Nicaraguans and to deport those already living in Costa Rica. However, the government has also initiated programs to promote economic prosperity for the poorest immigrant populations, also hailing from Nicaragua. There are also a number of political refugees who have sought asylum from persecution in Costa Rica.

=== Opposition to immigration ===
Anti-immigrant feelings date back to the late 19th century and early 20th century with the country's first waves of migrations from places like China, Lebanon and Poland. Non-Polish European migration dates back to practically the independence from Spain but was generally well received. Polish migration was mostly Jewish thus the backlash was due to antisemitism. Records of the time show Chinese migrants as the most affected by prejudice especially from government official and the first anti-Chinese laws were enacted as far back as the 1910s. In 1903 President Ascensión Esquivel Ibarra enacted one of the first decrees forbidding non-White immigration and explicitly stating that migration from Asians, Blacks, Gypsies, Arabs and Turks was not allowed. Although these laws were common in Latin America at the time, and Costa Rica's government eventually became the lead force in its abolishment.

Polish, Chinese and Lebanese migrants would integrate fully into Costa Rican society with time to the point that many prominent Costa Ricans from industry, politics, arts, academy, etc. are of those descents. Latin American migrants became the next source of mistrust and opposition, especially Nicaraguan and Colombian migrants. During the second half of the 20th century and to this date Costa Rica receives numerous waves of Latin American migrants from all the region, but Nicaraguans are by far the higher group among immigrant population encompassing 74.6% of the immigrant population, followed by Colombians and Americans (immigrants in general are 9% of the population) making ethnic Nicaraguans and binational Nicaraguan-Costa Rican citizens one of the most notorious ethnic minorities in Costa Rica outnumbering other groups like African-Costa Ricans. This caused debate in the country with some voices claiming for harder regulations and border control. The issue was one of the main topics of the 2002 election and was again important for the 2018's campaign with right-wing politicians like Otto Guevara quoting Donald Trump as an inspiration and calling for harsher migratory laws and eliminating the citizenship by birth in the Constitution. The Migration Law was reform globally in 2005 hardening some of the requirements for entering, staying and working on the country which was criticized as excessive, but further reforms, the last one in 2009, reduce some of the impact of the more controversial parts of the law. Far-right ultra-conservative National Restoration Party, that held an important role in the 2018 presidential election, also holds anti-migration positions.

After a series of fake news spread by several far-right Facebook pages inciting hatred against Nicaraguan migrants, an anti-migration manifestation was organized on 18 August 2018 known as the "Taken of La Merced" after Nicaraguan refugees were falsely accused of having "taking" La Merced Park in San Jose, a common gathering of the Nicaraguan community. Although some of the protesters were peaceful, participation of openly neo-Nazi groups and violent hooligans with criminal records caused riots and attacks on Nicaraguans or people suspected of being. The national police Public Force intervened with up to 44 people arrested, 36 of such were Costa Rican and the rest Nicaraguans. Several violent articles including Molotov bombs were confiscated and some of the protesters identify themselves with Swastikas and yelled "¡Fuera nicas!" (Nicas out!). A pro-immigrant manifestation was scheduled a week later with a high attendance. Further anti-migration protests (this time with the explicit exclusion of hooligans and neo-Nazi) were organized in later days but with lesser participation.

== Immigrant groups ==
The largest immigrant communities are from Nicaragua (74.6%), Colombia (4.3%), the United States (4.1%), Panama (2.9%) and El Salvador (2.4%). The remaining 11.7% are of other nationalities, with significant communities from China (3,281 people), Cuba (3,860 people), Honduras (3,778 people), Peru (3,404 people) and Venezuela (3,886 people). Many Europeans have immigrated to Costa Rica in recent years, especially Spaniards, Bulgarians, Russians, Ukrainians, Swiss and Swedish. There are also many Asian (Chinese, Taiwanese and Japanese) immigrants. Immigrants may be attracted by political stability, an alternative way of life and a mild climate.

=== Americans ===
Of the 16,000 Americans in the country, around half of them are under the age of 29. They mainly live in San José, Pérez Zeledón, Escazú, Alajuela, Santa Ana and Santa Cruz. American immigrants work in the fields of education, commerce, tourism, and administrative activities. About half of these immigrants have dual citizenship.

=== Argentines ===
Costa Rica is the country with the highest population of Argentines in Central America. According to the census of 2012, there were 3,600 Argentines living in Costa Rica. Historically there were two migratory waves of refugees escaping from military dictatorships who ruled Argentina between 1976 and 1983. A second wave occurred during Argentina's economic crisis (1999-2002), when many Argentine professionals decided to migrate to Costa Rica. The largest numbers of Argentines in Costa Rica come from Buenos Aires, Córdoba and Rosario. Most of them reside in the provinces of San José, Cartago, Limón and Guanacaste.

=== Belizeans ===
According to the census of 2012, there are about 1,275 Belizeans in Costa Rica. Many have arrived as part of the Mormon missions.

=== Brazilians ===
According to the census of 2012, there are about 1,300 Brazilians in Costa Rica. Many of those who come are actors, actresses, models and television hosts.

=== Britons ===
After the independence of Costa Rica (1821), the Costa Rican government encouraged foreign immigration to strengthen the workforce. The new arrivals came mainly from Central Europe and North America, although Germans, Britons and Americans also arrived, the latter two known collectively as Anglos. Britain was the first to notice the potential that Costa Rica had to offer from coffee production; over time, agricultural areas of the Caribbean and northern Costa Rica were under British control, especially the coffee farms. Afterwards the Britons brought in Italians for construction of the railroad of Altiplano. Most of the agriculturally productive areas were held by the British.

According to the census of 2012, there are about 5,200 Britons in Costa Rica, forming the second-largest European community after the Spaniards.

=== Canadians ===
According to the census of 2011, there are about 1,700 Canadians in Costa Rica. They mainly come from Calgary, Alberta and Ottawa. Many work in tourism and are residents on the coast, near popular beaches while others live in the cities such as San José and Santa Ana.

=== Chileans ===
According to the census of 2012, there are nearly 2,600 Chileans living in Costa Rica. They have mostly settled in urban areas such as San José.

=== Chinese ===
The Chinese community in Costa Rica (including Taiwanese) is the largest Asian community in the country. According with the census of 2012, there are about 4,500 Chinese living in the country. The first Chinese immigrants arrived in Costa Rica in 1855. They were a group of 77 people originally from Canton, who had come to Central America to work on the Panama Railroad. During 1859-1863 under the administration of José María Montealegre, laws were enacted that prohibited the immigration of blacks and Asians, in an effort to preserve Costa Rica for European settlement. Later, "a Chinese colony" began to form in that area, founded by Joseph Chen Apuy, an immigrant from Zhongshan, Guangdong, who arrived in 1873. The colony, named Puntarenas, was so well known in China that some thought in error that it was the name of a country. In the 1970s, Taiwan became the source of the highest number of Chinese immigrants to Costa Rica. However, many used to Costa Rica as a temporary stop while waiting for permission to live in the United States or Canada.

=== Colombians ===
Beginning in the 1980s, Costa Rica became a refuge for thousands of Colombians who have fled the Colombian civil war. According to the census of 2012, there are about 20,000 Colombians in Costa Rica, making it the tenth-largest community of Colombians outside the country. Many Colombian immigrants are educated, which makes it easier for them to achieve dual citizenship. Colombians in Costa Rica are one of the fastest growing diasporas in this Central American country.

=== Cubans ===
According to the census of 2012, there are over 1,700 Cubans living in Costa Rica. Immigration began from the 1960s through boats of refugees fleeing the dictatorship of Fidel Castro. They were attracted by the political stability of Costa Rica.

=== Dominicans ===
According to the census of 2012, there are about 1,475 Dominicans in Costa Rica. They mainly live on the Caribbean coast.

=== Ecuadorians ===
According to the census of 2012, there are about 900 Ecuadorians in Costa Rica. Among these are television presenters, models or entrepreneurs, commonly living in the city of San José.

=== El Salvador ===
According to the census of 2012, there are about 7,189 Salvadorans in Costa Rica, mainly in San José. Many of them are from the upper class and looking to develop their businesses.

=== French ===
French immigration in Costa Rica began in the 1840s. Following the victory of liberal governments, it became easier for painters, musicians and French singers to immigrate. France has contributed greatly to Costa Rican culture and influence. French composer Gabriel-Pierre Lafond was in part responsible for the national anthem of Costa Rica, the primary composer of which was Manuel María Gutiérrez. The Museum of Art was created by French sculptor Louis-Robert Carrier Belleuse, and the flag of Costa Rica was inspired by the flag of France. Costa Rica is home to about 1,000 French people, according to the census of 2012.

=== Germans ===
The immigration of Germans to Costa Rica occurred in three main phases: prior to 1871 (the year in which the German Empire was founded), from 1871 to 1918, at the end of the First World War, and from 1918-1919 until the start of the Second World War in 1939. The first German immigrants arrived between 1825 and 1826. In 1850, the German immigration was insignificant. In 1864 there were 164 Germans living in Costa Rica. Most were attracted by the growing foreign commerce. Others migrated because of the economic situation facing Germany in the 1840s and the failed revolution in 1848. Then came another group in the late nineteenth century. There were new infrastructure projects, and existing personal networks between Germany and Costa Rica helped to increase immigration. Before the First World War, there was already a German Club, founded in 1910, and the German School which started in 1912. At the beginning of the Second World War, a third group of immigrants arrived. After the war, relations were broken between two countries, and many naturalized Germans after the war no longer appear in the statistics. Currently the census of 2012 states there are 2,100 Germans in Costa Rica.

=== Guatemalans ===
According to the census of 2012, there are about 1,200 Guatemalans in Costa Rica. There are both economic and political migrants. Most live in San José.

=== Haitians ===
According to the census of 2012, the Haitian community consists of 150 residents.

=== Hondurans ===
According to the census of 2012, there are 5,669 Hondurans in Costa Rica, who live mainly in San José. Many of these immigrants arrived via Nicaragua.

=== Indians ===
As of December 2016, the Indian community in Costa Rica consists of 250 residents, primarily employed in the country's IT industry. Out of these, twenty have renounced Indian citizenship and hold PIO cards.

=== Italians ===
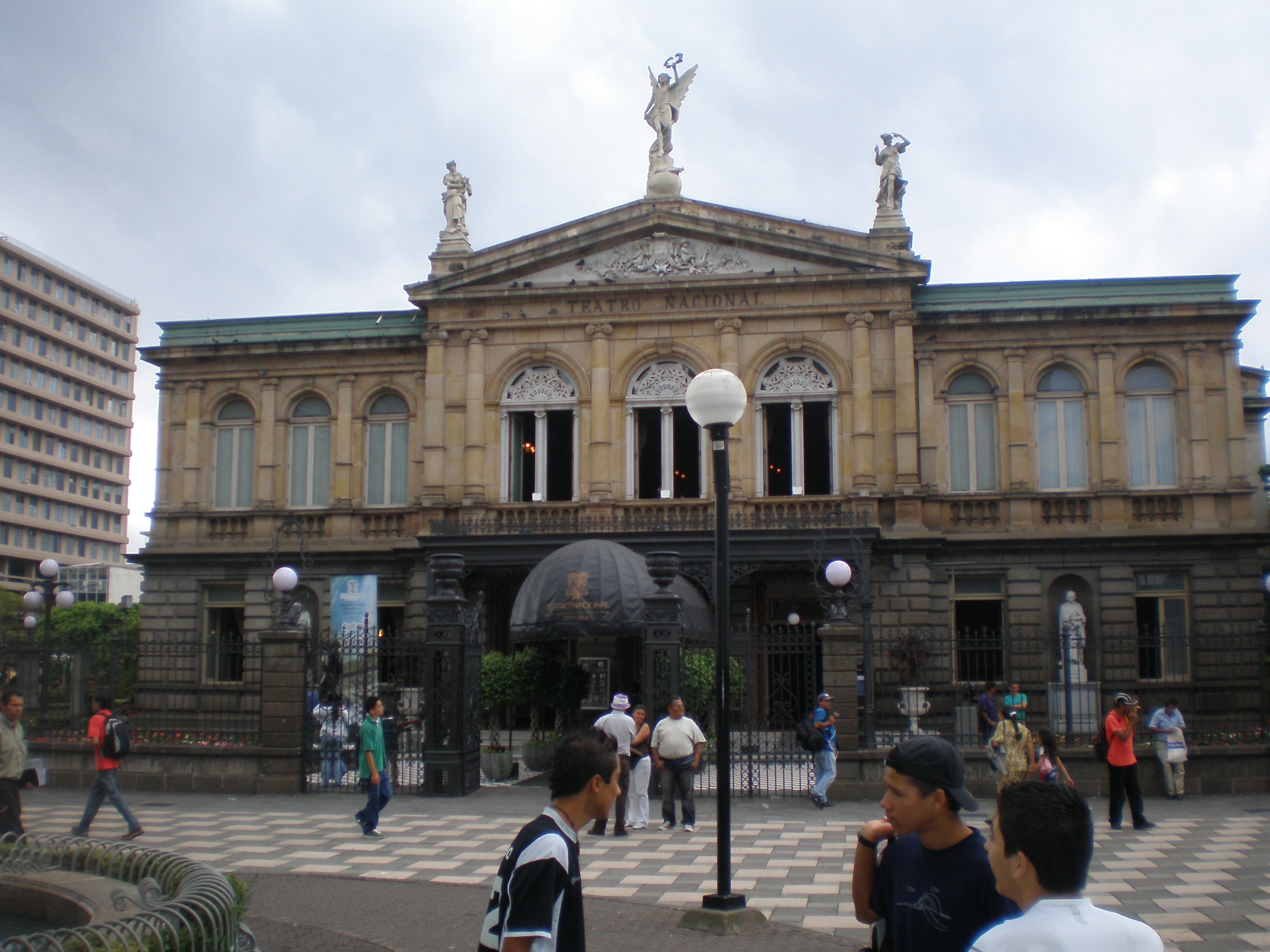
The "National Theatre" in San Jose, Costa Rica, was built by the Italian engineer Cristoforo Molinari in 1897. It has a striking resemblance to the Temple of the Opera, La Scala in Milan.

Italian migration to Costa Rica consists of several migratory waves between 1887 and 1888. In February 1887, the American railroad entrepreneur, Minor Cooper Keith, had four hundred men working on a new line, but needed more labor. In October of the same year, following unsuccessful attempts to persuade commissioners in Italy, the Canary Islands and Cape Verde, Keith traveled to London to arrange the import of Italian workers. On 10 May 1888, the Anna Elise docked in Limón (Costa Rica). It was carrying 671 workers. These Italians joined other immigrants from China and elsewhere building the first railway line in Costa Rica. The conditions were dangerous, and the Italians were angered by the deaths of many workers. In October 1888, the Italian workers called a strike, and on 20 October 1888, large numbers deserted the work camps and fled to Cartago (Costa Rica), where many settled, but others returned on a ship to Italy. They were replaced by 848 immigrants who came on 16 March 1889.

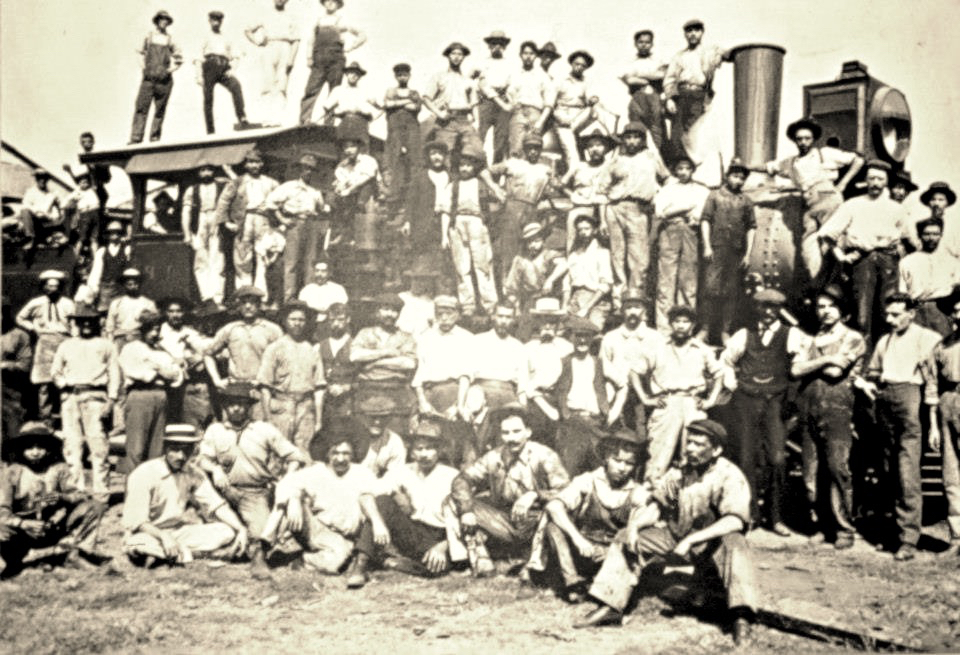
Italians working in a Costa Rica's railway. A few of them remained to live in Costa Rica and their descendants resettled in the San Vito area

A group of Italians immigrated to the San Vito area in the mid-1950s. These agricultural colonists had to confront many problems, especially due to the isolation of this region. Nevertheless, from 1964 on, the production of coffee caused the outlook to change for the better, 500 Italian colonists and many Costa Ricans (someone descendants from the Italian rail workers) from different parts of the country were attracted by the economic possibilities that the area offered.

Currently, according to the census of 2012, there are 2,300 Italians in Costa Rica, and their descendants are found in Cartago.

=== Jamaican ===
For the construction of the Atlantic Railroad, Henry Meiggs Keith, an American hired by the Costa Rican government, insisted on utilizing "black" (later known as Afro-American) workers, who had knowledge of the British Imperial System in the building of the railroad, for clearing the forest, and building the railroad tracks, and in 1872 the first group of Jamaicans entered the country. These Jamaicans and their descendants would become the main inhabitants of the Caribbean region of the country, thereby establishing a culture that was unique within Costa Rica. Two large Jamaican migrations occurred; firstly, during the railroad construction era, and then in the next century, for the banana plantations owned by the United Standard Fruit Company.

=== Japanese ===
According to the census of 2012, the Japanese community in Costa Rica amounts to 190 people. The Japanese have developed many technological companies in the country.

=== Mexicans ===
Costa Rica is most popular Central American country for Mexican immigration. The waves of migration from Mexico to Costa Rica started in 1970s, as people were attracted to its stable democracy, mild climate and political stability. According to the census of 2012, 4,285 Mexicans were living in Costa Rica from Nuevo León, Tamaulipas, Chihuahua, Baja California and Mexico City. They are typically professionals, doctors, secretaries, among other roles. Costa Rica is the ninth most popular destination for Mexican immigrants in the world.

=== Nicaraguans ===
Nicaraguans constitute nearly three-quarters of the foreign-born population of Costa Rica. In 1984, there were 45,918 Nicaraguan-born people in Costa Rica. In 2012, the number had grown to around 287,000, reflecting significant migration driven by socio-political instability in Nicaragua. Panamanians According to the 2012 census, there are 11,427 Panamanians in Costa Rica. They mainly live in San José. They form 4.1% of the immigrant population, making them the fifth-largest immigrant community in Costa Rica. This migration is influenced by a history of authoritarian rule, economic disparities, and political unrest in Nicaragua; the intensification of these factors increased under Ortega's presidency which has seen "over 200,000 citizens forced into exile due to persecution by the Nicaraguan dictatorship".

Many Nicaraguans have settled in the northern zone of Costa Rica, a region integral to the national food supply. It's important to note that Nicaraguan migrants historically have contributed significantly to various local economies, especially in agriculture and domestic work. Even more than in prior years, they are facing social and legal challenges due to their immigration status and the laws concerning immigration and refugee rights in Costa Rica.

=== Panamanians ===
According to the census of 2012, there are 11,427 Panamanians in Costa Rica. They mainly live in San José. They form 4.1% of the immigrant population, making them the fifth-largest immigrant community in Costa Rica.

=== Peruvians ===
The census of 2012 found that nearly 2,700 Peruvians were living in Costa Rica. Some arrived directly from their country of origin, while others had emigrated first to Chile and then fled the anti-Peruvian sentiment in Chile. Although there are also cases of racism against Peruvians in Costa Rica, they occur to a lesser extent.

=== Polish ===
Polish immigration to Costa Rica occurred from 1929 to 1941. In 1929, about fifteen Poles arrived in Costa Rica, with the number rising to 90 in 1930. Among the first Polish arrivals were Jewish immigrants Jacobo Schifter and Lollew Gudmundson, who left their country to settle in Costa Rica This became a motivator for many more Poles to go Costa Rica. The largest wave of immigration of Poles to Costa Rica was between 1933 and 1936. Xenophobia developed in Costa Rica, because most of the Poles were of Jewish origin. The Poles in Costa Rica were engaged in the home industry and small businesses. Later, around 1939, several waves of Jewish Polish families fleeing the Nazi repression arrived. Others followed after the war. By the 1950s, the majority left the country to emigrate to Mexico or Argentina. Currently the census of 2012 says there are 1,900 Poles in Costa Rica.

=== Russian and ex-Soviet peoples ===
Russian and Soviet immigration to Costa Rica occurred during the twentieth century. The arrivals hail in greatest numbers from Volga, Belarus (including people from Ukraine and the Baltic countries), coming as refugees after the First World War and the Cold War. A number of Costa Ricans studied in the Soviet Union through scholarships, and came back married to Russians, establishing families in Costa Rica. According to the census of 2012, there are over 2,300 Russians in Costa Rica.

=== South Koreans ===
Korean immigration is a recent phenomenon in Central America. The first Koreans came to Costa Rica in the 1990s, working in the clothing, automobile, restaurant and transportation businesses. There are many institutes and Korean associations. With a high percentage of Protestants among the population, some are missionaries of the Korean church. The Korean community is not large in Costa Rica, comprising 522 residents according to the census of 2012.

=== Spaniards ===
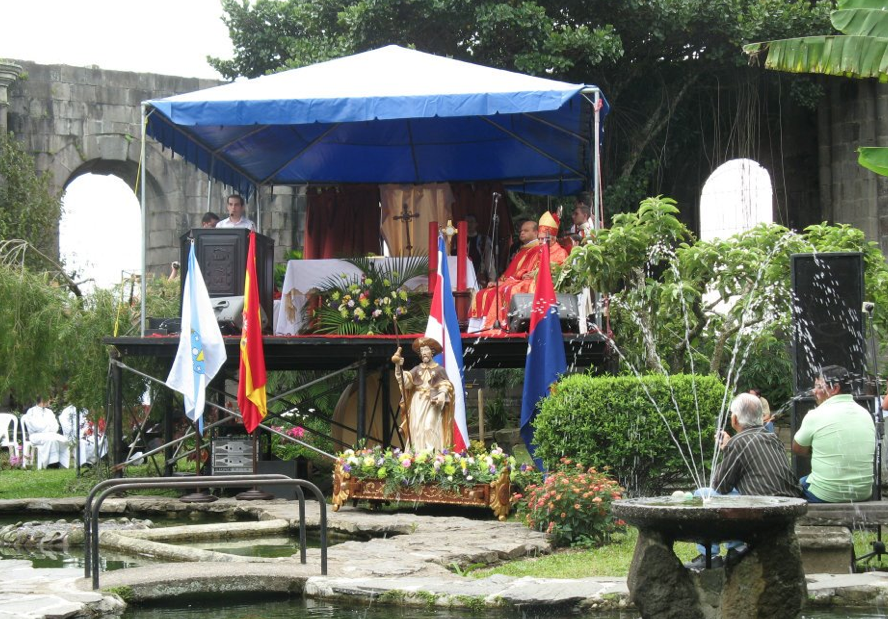
Celebration of Santiago Apóstol in Costa Rica.

Spanish immigration began with the exploration of Hernán Ponce de León and Juan de Castañeda along the Pacific coast in the early sixteenth century, who soon after placed the native population of this region under Spanish control. After independence, the governors were interested in populating the territories with white workers, preferably imported from Europe. Banana cultivation and labor for the construction of the railway to the Atlantic attracted foreign capital. In the census of 1864, there were only 41 Spaniards in Costa Rica, however, the number increased to 2,527 by 1927.

In the early twentieth century, many Spaniards used Costa Rica as a bridge to move to Panama, attracted by the construction of the Panama Canal. The events in Catalonia in the same time period prompted many Catalans to migrate to Costa Rica, becoming in a few years a thriving and influential community in San José that persists today. Currently, Catalans make up the largest portion of Spaniards in Costa Rica. According to the 2009 census, there are currently 16,482 Spanish citizens in Costa Rica.

=== Swiss ===
Swiss people have immigrated to Costa Rica since the nineteenth century, and have been involved in the development of Costa Rican chocolate. According to the census of 2012, there are about 1,642 Swiss in Costa Rica.

=== Uruguayans ===
According to the census of 2012, there are about 1,200 Uruguayans in Costa Rica. This country has recently proved attractive for Uruguayans entrepreneurs.

=== Venezuelans ===
According to the census of 2012, there are about 3,886 Venezuelans in Costa Rica that live mainly in San José, in the areas of Escazú and Santa Ana. Most of them have arrived as refugees from political problems in their country. This population increased significantly from 2015 to 2019, mostly due to the Venezuelan political and economical crisis. Nowadays there are about 15,000 Venezuelans in Costa Rica.

== See also ==
- Demographics of Costa Rica

== Notes ==
- 1. The statistics of this page comes from the Wikipedia page in Spanish (Costa Rica) in section demography.
- 2. Some sections are partial translations of the Spanish Wikipedia page (Inmigracion en Costa Rica) and its creators.
