= Demographics of Costa Rica =

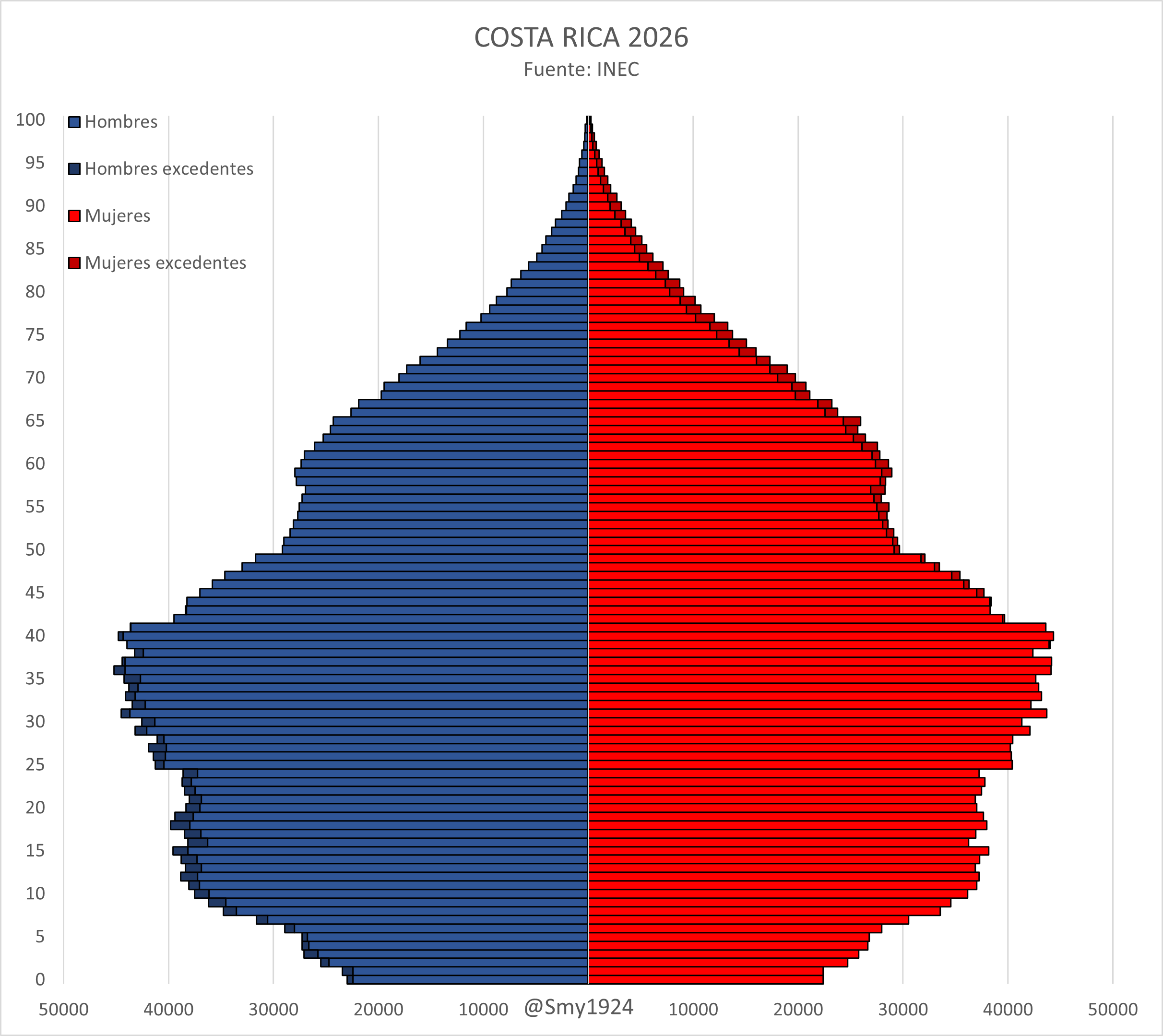
- Costa Rica population pyramid in 2026
- Population: 5,181,619
- Birth rate: 10.2 births/1,000 population (2022 est.)
- Death rate: 5.6 deaths/1,000 population (2022 est.)
- Fertility rate: 1.29 children per woman (2022 est.)
- Immigrant share: 12.2% (2024)

Age structure
- 0–14 years: 18.71%
- 15–64 years: 68.44%
- 65 and over: 12.85%

Nationality
- Nationality: Costa Rican
- Major ethnic: White (65.8%); Spanish (N/D); Italian (N/D); Others (N/D)
- Minor ethnic: Multiracial (24.5%); Mestizo (17.8%); Mulatto (6.7%); Indigenous (2.4%); African (1.1%); East Asian (0.2%); Chinese (N/D); Others (N/D); Others (6.0%)

Language
- Official: Spanish
- Spoken: Spanish, English, Mekatelyu, BriBri, Patois

According to the United Nations, Costa Rica had an estimated population of 5,265,575 people as of 2024. White people make up 65.8% of the population, 17.8% identity as castizos or mestizos, 7.8% are black people (including mixed race), 2.4% Amerindians, and 6.2% other/none.

In 2010, just under 3% of the population was of African descent. These are called Afro-Costa Ricans or West Indians and are English-speaking descendants of 19th-century black Jamaican immigrant workers. Another 1% is composed of those of Chinese origin, and less than 1% are West Asian, mainly of Lebanese descent but also Palestinians. The 2011 Census provided the following data: whites and mestizos make up 83.4% of the population, 7% are black people (including mixed race), 2.4% Amerindians, 0.2% Chinese, and 7% other/none.

Immigration to Costa Rica made up 9% of the population in 2012. This included permanent settlers as well as migrants who were hoping to reach the U.S. In 2015, there were some 420,000 immigrants in Costa Rica and the number of asylum seekers (mainly from Honduras, El Salvador, Guatemala and Nicaragua) rose to more than 110,000. An estimated 10% of the Costa Rican population in 2014 was made up of Nicaraguans. There is also a community of North American retirees from the United States and Canada, followed by relatively large numbers of European Union expatriates (chiefly Scandinavians and from Germany) come to retire as well, and Australians.

Despite a low fertility rate of 1.67 children per woman (2024), the population still grows steadily due to immigration and a relatively young population.

The indigenous population today numbers about 60,000 (just over 1% of the population), with some Miskito and Garifuna (a population of mixed African and Carib Amerindian descent) living in the coastal regions.

Costa Rica's emigration is the smallest in the Caribbean Basin and is among the smallest in the Americas. By 2015 about just 133,185 (2.77%) of the country's people live in another country as immigrants. The main destination countries are the United States (85,924), Nicaragua (10,772), Panama (7,760), Canada (5,039), Spain (3,339), Mexico (2,464), Germany (1,891), Italy (1,508), Guatemala (1,162) and Venezuela (1,127).

== Population size and structure ==
Costa Rican Censuses
| Year | Population | %± |
|---|---|---|
| 1864 | 120,499 | — |
| 1883 | 182,073 | 51.1 |
| 1892 | 243,205 | 33.6 |
| 1927 | 471,524 | 93.9 |
| 1950 | 800,875 | 69.8 |
| 1963 | 1,336,274 | 66.9 |
| 1973 | 1,871,780 | 40.1 |
| 1984 | 2,416,809 | 29.1 |
| 2000 | 3,810,179 | 57.7 |
| 2011 | 4,301,712 | 12.9 |
| 2022 | 5,044,197 | 14.7 |

View source data.
View source data.
View source data.
View source data.

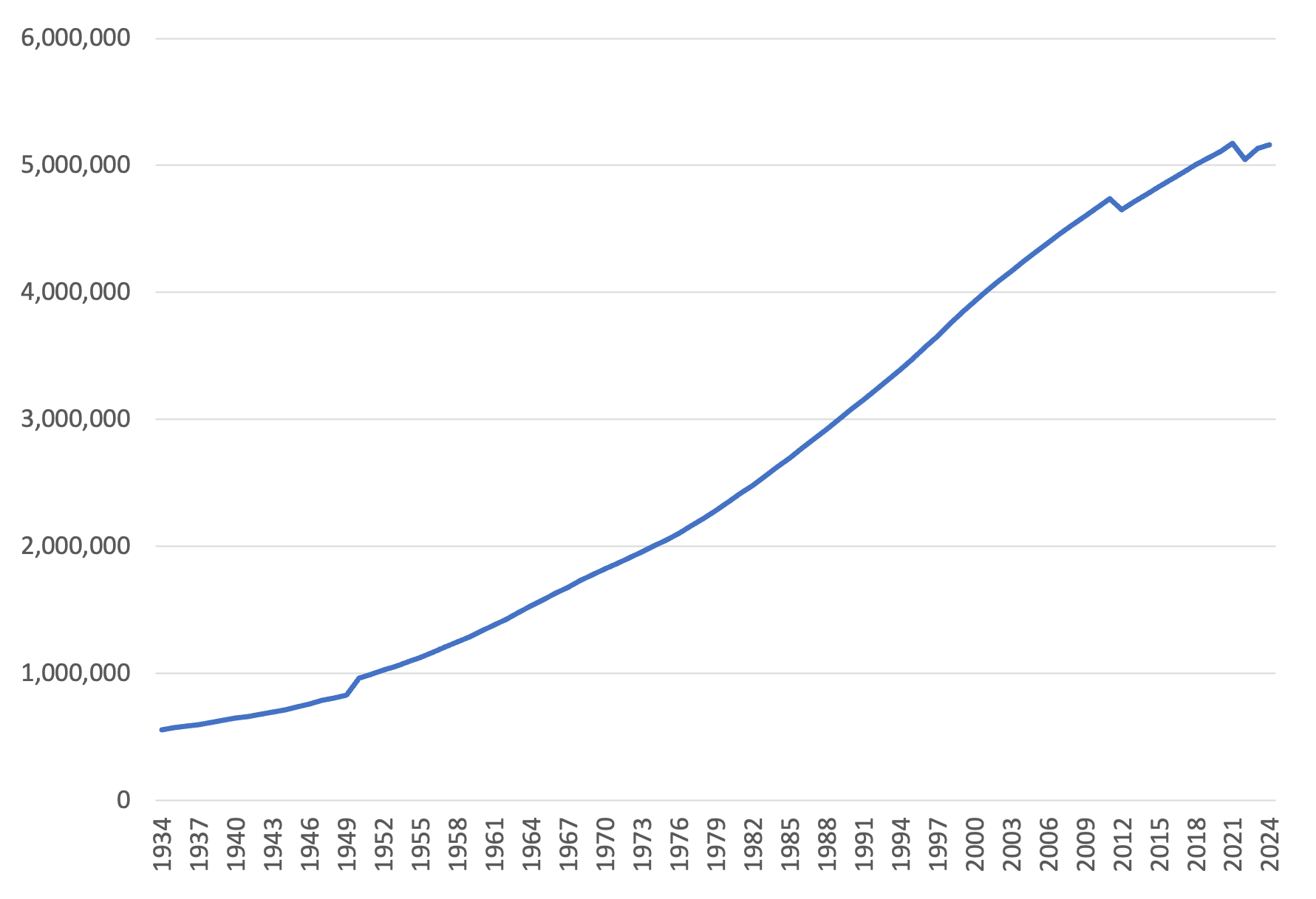
Costa Rica's population (1934-2024).

In 2021, Costa Rica had a population of 5,153,957. The population is increasing at a rate of 1.5% per year. According to current trends, the population will increase to 9,158,000 in about 46 years. The population density is 94 people per square km, the third highest in Central America.

Approximately 20% lived in rural areas and 80% in urban areas. The rate of urbanization estimated for the period 2005–2015 is 2.74% per annum, one of the highest among developing countries. About 75% of the population lives above 500 meters, where the temperature is cooler and milder.

The 2011 census counted a population of 4.3 million people distributed among the following groups: 71.1% Whites or Castizos,17% Mestizo, 6.7% Black/Mulatto mixed race, 2.4% Native American, 1.1% Black or Afro-Caribbean; the census showed 1.1% as Other.

In 2011, there were over 104,000 Native American or indigenous inhabitants, representing 2.4% of the population. Most of them lived in secluded reservations, distributed among eight ethnic groups: Quitirrisí (in the Central Valley), Matambú or Chorotega (Guanacaste), Maleku (northern Alajuela), Bribri (southern Atlantic), Cabécar (Cordillera de Talamanca), Guaymí (southern Costa Rica, along the Panamá border), Boruca (southern Costa Rica) and Térraba (southern Costa Rica).

Costa Ricans of European origin are primarily of Spanish descent, with significant numbers of Italian, German, English, Dutch, French, Irish, Portuguese, and Polish families, as well as a sizable Jewish community. The majority of the Afro-Costa Ricans are Creole English-speaking descendants of 19th century black Jamaican immigrant workers.

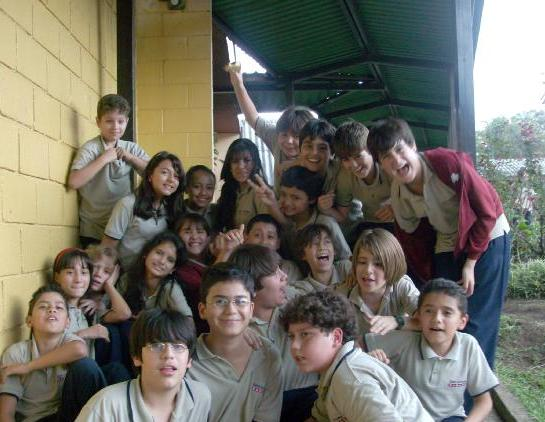
Costa Rican school children

The 2011 census classified 83.6% of the population as white and Mestizo; the latter have combined European and Native American descent. The Mulatto segment (mix of white and black) represented 6.7%, and Indigenous people made up 2.4% of the population. Native and European mixed blood populations are far less than in other Latin American countries. Exceptions are the Guanacaste province, where almost half the population is visibly mestizo, a legacy of the more pervasive unions between Spanish colonists and Chorotega Amerindians through several generations, and Limón, where the vast majority of the Afro-Costa Rican community lives.

| Province | Province population | City | City population |
|---|---|---|---|
| San José Province | 1,345,750 | San José | 350,535 |
| Alajuela Province | 716,286 | Alajuela | 46,554 |
| Cartago Province | 432,395 | Cartago | 156,600 |
| Puntarenas Province | 357,483 | Puntarenas | 102,504 |
| Heredia Province | 354,732 | Heredia | 42,600 |
| Limón Province | 339,395 | Puerto Limon | 105,000 |
| Guanacaste Province | 264,238 | Liberia | 98,751 |

=== Structure of the population ===
Population Estimates by Sex and Age Group (01.VII.2017) (Based on the national household survey of 2017.):

| Age group | Male | Female | Total | % |
|---|---|---|---|---|
| Total | 2 405 636 | 2 541 064 | 4 946 700 | 100 |
| 0–4 | 153 647 | 153 302 | 306 949 | 6.20 |
| 5–9 | 180 403 | 179 809 | 360 212 | 7.28 |
| 10–14 | 200 123 | 174 821 | 374 944 | 7.57 |
| 15–19 | 216 776 | 211 077 | 427 853 | 8.64 |
| 20–24 | 215 301 | 205 588 | 420 889 | 8.50 |
| 25–29 | 188 815 | 198 789 | 387 604 | 7.83 |
| 30–34 | 176 356 | 198 185 | 373 541 | 7.55 |
| 35–39 | 161 288 | 174 851 | 336 139 | 7.40 |
| 40–44 | 145 430 | 164 672 | 310 102 | 6.26 |
| 45–49 | 136 591 | 163 412 | 300 003 | 6.06 |
| 50–54 | 146 253 | 168 407 | 314 660 | 6.36 |
| 55–59 | 133 924 | 144 718 | 278 642 | 5.63 |
| 60–64 | 108 422 | 126 063 | 234 485 | 4.74 |
| 65–69 | 83 152 | 92 321 | 175 473 | 3.54 |
| 70–74 | 55 495 | 75 098 | 130 593 | 2.64 |
| 75–79 | 50 799 | 45 514 | 96 313 | 1.94 |
| 80–84 | 28 176 | 31 126 | 59 302 | 1.20 |
| 85–89 | 16 164 | 20 771 | 36 935 | 0.74 |
| 90–94 | 6 159 | 10 188 | 16 347 | 0.33 |
| 95+ | 2 362 | 3 352 | 5 714 | 0.11 |
| Age group | Male | Female | Total | Percent |
| 0–14 | 522 072 | 498 520 | 1 020 592 | 21.63 |
| 15–64 | 1 580 192 | 1 676 121 | 3 256 313 | 69.02 |
| 65+ | 187 174 | 248 444 | 435 618 | 9.23 |
| unknown | 3 000 | 2 158 | 5 158 | 0.10 |

Population Estimates by Sex and Age Group (01.VII.2021) (Based on the annual national household survey and the 2011 population census.):

| Age group | Male | Female | Total | % |
|---|---|---|---|---|
| Total | 2 482 471 | 2 680 942 | 5 163 413 | 100 |
| 0–4 | 124 613 | 133 474 | 258 087 | 5.00 |
| 5–9 | 165 238 | 165 966 | 331 204 | 6.41 |
| 10–14 | 192 664 | 184 342 | 377 006 | 7.30 |
| 15–19 | 205 825 | 193 150 | 398 975 | 7.73 |
| 20–24 | 213 937 | 206 672 | 420 609 | 8.15 |
| 25–29 | 187 872 | 181 842 | 369 714 | 7.16 |
| 30–34 | 180 627 | 186 317 | 366 944 | 7.11 |
| 35–39 | 171 681 | 199 074 | 370 755 | 7.18 |
| 40–44 | 170 025 | 192 808 | 362 833 | 7.03 |
| 45–49 | 146 946 | 167 271 | 314 217 | 6.09 |
| 50–54 | 150 529 | 178 318 | 328 847 | 6.37 |
| 55–59 | 147 298 | 173 022 | 320 320 | 6.20 |
| 60–64 | 132 034 | 148 439 | 280 473 | 5.43 |
| 65–69 | 105 615 | 133 821 | 239 436 | 4.64 |
| 70–74 | 75 845 | 90 945 | 166 790 | 3.23 |
| 75–79 | 51 931 | 63 090 | 115 021 | 2.23 |
| 80–84 | 32 001 | 43 126 | 75 127 | 1.45 |
| 85–89 | 18 172 | 25 283 | 43 455 | 0.84 |
| 90–94 | 7 628 | 9 021 | 16 649 | 0.32 |
| 95+ | 1 990 | 4 961 | 6 951 | 0.13 |
| Age group | Male | Female | Total | Percent |
| 0–14 | 482 515 | 483 782 | 966 297 | 18.71 |
| 15–64 | 1 706 774 | 1 826 913 | 3 533 687 | 68.44 |
| 65+ | 293 182 | 370 247 | 663 429 | 12.85 |

== Vital statistics ==
| | Average population | Live births | Deaths | Natural change | Crude birth rate (per 1000) | Crude death rate (per 1000) | Natural change (per 1000) | Crude migration rate (per 1000) | TFR |
|---|---|---|---|---|---|---|---|---|---|
| 1934 | 558,000 | 23,858 | 10,020 | 13,838 | 44.2 | 18.6 | 25.6 | | |
| 1935 | 572,000 | 24,934 | 12,630 | 12,304 | 45.2 | 22.9 | 22.3 | 2.8 | |
| 1936 | 585,000 | 25,450 | 11,811 | 13,639 | 45.2 | 21.0 | 24.2 | -1.5 | |
| 1937 | 599,000 | 25,624 | 11,032 | 14,592 | 44.5 | 19.2 | 25.3 | -1.4 | |
| 1938 | 615,000 | 26,839 | 10,422 | 16,417 | 45.5 | 17.7 | 27.8 | -1.1 | |
| 1939 | 631,000 | 27,027 | 11,687 | 15,340 | 44.7 | 19.3 | 25.4 | 0.6 | |
| 1940 | 648,000 | 28,004 | 11,211 | 16,793 | 45.3 | 18.1 | 27.2 | -0.3 | |
| 1941 | 664,000 | 28,823 | 11,429 | 17,394 | 45.5 | 18.1 | 27.4 | -2.7 | |
| 1942 | 680,000 | 28,263 | 13,559 | 14,704 | 43.7 | 21.0 | 22.7 | 1.4 | |
| 1943 | 697,000 | 30,468 | 11,734 | 18,734 | 46.1 | 17.7 | 28.4 | -3.4 | |
| 1944 | 716,000 | 29,935 | 11,295 | 18,640 | 44.2 | 16.7 | 27.5 | -0.2 | |
| 1945 | 736,000 | 32,529 | 10,768 | 21,761 | 46.8 | 15.5 | 31.3 | -3.4 | |
| 1946 | 759,000 | 32,159 | 9,971 | 22,188 | 45.0 | 13.9 | 31.1 | 0.1 | |
| 1947 | 787,000 | 32,600 | 10,967 | 21,633 | 44.7 | 14.9 | 29.8 | 7.1 | |
| 1948 | 808,000 | 35,956 | 10,666 | 25,290 | 44.5 | 13.2 | 31.3 | -4.6 | |
| 1949 | 832,000 | 36,774 | 10,566 | 26,208 | 44.2 | 12.7 | 31.5 | -1,8 | |
| 1950 | 966,000 | 39,943 | 10,480 | 29,463 | 41.3 | 10.8 | 30.5 | 130.6 | |
| 1951 | 994,000 | 43,068 | 10,390 | 32,678 | 43.3 | 10.5 | 32.9 | -3.9 | |
| 1952 | 1,025,000 | 45,816 | 10,672 | 35,144 | 44.7 | 10.4 | 34.3 | -3.1 | |
| 1953 | 1,058,000 | 45,697 | 11,353 | 34,344 | 43.2 | 10.7 | 32.5 | -0.3 | |
| 1954 | 1,093,000 | 48,857 | 10,681 | 38,176 | 44.7 | 9.8 | 34.9 | -1.8 | |
| 1955 | 1,129,000 | 49,800 | 11,000 | 39,269 | 44.1 | 9.7 | 34.8 | -1.9 | |
| 1956 | 1,167,000 | 51,350 | 10,476 | 40,874 | 44.0 | 9.0 | 35.1 | -1.4 | |
| 1957 | 1,206,000 | 52,860 | 11,544 | 41,316 | 43.9 | 9.6 | 34.3 | -0.9 | |
| 1958 | 1,246,000 | 53,919 | 10,608 | 43,311 | 43.3 | 8.5 | 34.8 | --1.6 | |
| 1959 | 1,289,000 | 57,801 | 11,160 | 46,641 | 44.8 | 8.7 | 36.2 | -1.7 | |
| 1960 | 1,334,000 | 59,701 | 11,035 | 48,666 | 44.8 | 8.3 | 36.5 | -1.6 | |
| 1961 | 1,382,000 | 60,641 | 10,644 | 49,997 | 43.9 | 7.7 | 36.2 | -0.2 | |
| 1962 | 1,431,000 | 60,750 | 11,953 | 48,797 | 42.5 | 8.4 | 34.1 | 1.4 | |
| 1963 | 1,482,000 | 62,821 | 12,519 | 50,302 | 42.4 | 8.5 | 34.0 | 1.6 | |
| 1964 | 1,533,000 | 61,870 | 13,527 | 48,343 | 40.4 | 8.8 | 31.6 | 2.8 | |
| 1965 | 1,583,000 | 62,400 | 12,814 | 49,586 | 39.4 | 8.1 | 31.3 | 1.3 | |
| 1966 | 1,633,000 | 62,330 | 11,403 | 50,927 | 38.2 | 7.0 | 31.2 | 0.4 | |
| 1967 | 1,681,000 | 61,229 | 11,289 | 49,940 | 36.4 | 6.7 | 29.7 | -0.3 | |
| 1968 | 1,729,000 | 60,902 | 10,653 | 50,249 | 35.2 | 6.2 | 29.1 | -0.5 | |
| 1969 | 1,776,000 | 59,636 | 11,599 | 48,037 | 33.6 | 6.5 | 27.1 | 0.1 | |
| 1970 | 1,822,000 | 59,557 | 11,504 | 48,053 | 32.7 | 6.3 | 26.4 | -0.5 | |
| 1971 | 1,867,000 | 58,138 | 10,575 | 47,563 | 31.2 | 5.7 | 25.5 | -0.8 | |
| 1972 | 1,911,000 | 59,274 | 10,855 | 48,419 | 31.0 | 5.7 | 25.4 | -1.8 | |
| 1973 | 1,956,000 | 58,177 | 9,702 | 48,475 | 29.8 | 5.0 | 24.8 | -1.3 | |
| 1974 | 2,002,000 | 57,749 | 9,512 | 48,237 | 28.9 | 4.8 | 24.1 | -0.6 | |
| 1975 | 2,052,000 | 59,175 | 9,615 | 49,560 | 28.9 | 4.7 | 24.2 | 0.8 | |
| 1976 | 2,105,000 | 60,668 | 9,356 | 51,312 | 28.8 | 4.4 | 24.4 | 1.4 | |
| 1977 | 2,162,000 | 64,190 | 8,907 | 55,283 | 29.7 | 4.1 | 25.6 | 1.5 | |
| 1978 | 2,222,000 | 67,722 | 8,625 | 59,097 | 30.5 | 3.9 | 26.6 | 1.2 | |
| 1979 | 2,284,000 | 69,318 | 9,143 | 60,175 | 30.4 | 4.0 | 26.4 | 1.5 | |
| 1980 | 2,348,000 | 70,048 | 9,268 | 61,780 | 29.8 | 3.9 | 26.3 | 1.7 | 3.63 |
| 1981 | 2,415,000 | 72,294 | 8,990 | 63,304 | 30.0 | 3.7 | 26.2 | 2.3 | 3.62 |
| 1982 | 2,483,000 | 73,168 | 9,168 | 64,000 | 29.5 | 3.7 | 25.8 | 2.4 | 3.54 |
| 1983 | 2,554,000 | 72,944 | 9,432 | 63,536 | 28.6 | 3.7 | 24.9 | 3.7 | 3.41 |
| 1984 | 2,626,000 | 76,878 | 9,931 | 66,217 | 29.0 | 3.8 | 25.2 | 3.0 | 3.44 |
| 1985 | 2,699,000 | 84,337 | 10,493 | 73,841 | 31.3 | 3.9 | 27.4 | 0.4 | 3.72 |
| 1986 | 2,773,000 | 83,194 | 10,449 | 72,745 | 30.0 | 3.8 | 26.3 | 1.1 | 3.58 |
| 1987 | 2,848,000 | 80,326 | 10,687 | 69,639 | 28.2 | 3.8 | 24.5 | 2.5 | 3.36 |
| 1988 | 2,924,000 | 81,376 | 10,944 | 70,432 | 27.8 | 3.7 | 24.1 | 2.6 | 3.33 |
| 1989 | 3,001,000 | 83,460 | 11,272 | 72,188 | 27.8 | 3.8 | 24.1 | 2,2 | 3.35 |
| 1990 | 3,079,000 | 81,939 | 11,366 | 70,573 | 26.6 | 3.7 | 22.9 | 3.1 | 3.20 |
| 1991 | 3,156,000 | 81,110 | 11,792 | 69,318 | 25.7 | 3.7 | 22.0 | 3.0 | 3.04 |
| 1992 | 3,234,000 | 80,164 | 12,253 | 67,911 | 24.8 | 3.8 | 21.0 | 3.7 | 3.02 |
| 1993 | 3,312,000 | 79,714 | 12,544 | 67,170 | 24.1 | 3.8 | 20.3 | 3.8 | 3.02 |
| 1994 | 3,394,000 | 80,391 | 13,313 | 67,078 | 23.7 | 3.9 | 19.8 | 5.0 | 2.85 |
| 1995 | 3,478,000 | 80,306 | 14,061 | 66,245 | 23.1 | 4.0 | 19.0 | 5.7 | 2.78 |
| 1996 | 3,567,000 | 79,203 | 13,993 | 65,210 | 22.2 | 3.9 | 18.3 | 7.3 | 2.69 |
| 1997 | 3,658,000 | 78,018 | 14,260 | 63,758 | 21.3 | 3.9 | 17.4 | 8.1 | 2.68 |
| 1998 | 3,751,000 | 76,982 | 14,708 | 62,274 | 20.5 | 3.9 | 16.6 | 8.8 | 2.60 |
| 1999 | 3,842,000 | 78,526 | 15,052 | 63,474 | 20.4 | 3.9 | 16.5 | 7.8 | 2.60 |
| 2000 | 3,930,000 | 78,178 | 14,944 | 63,234 | 19.9 | 3.8 | 16.1 | 6.8 | 2.41 |
| 2001 | 4,013,000 | 76,401 | 15,608 | 60,793 | 19.0 | 3.9 | 15.1 | 6.0 | 2.28 |
| 2002 | 4,094,000 | 71,144 | 15,004 | 56,140 | 17.4 | 3.7 | 13.7 | 6.5 | 2.08 |
| 2003 | 4,171,000 | 72,938 | 15,800 | 57,138 | 17.5 | 3.8 | 13.7 | 5.1 | 2.08 |
| 2004 | 4,246,000 | 72,247 | 15,949 | 56,298 | 17.0 | 3.8 | 13.3 | 4.7 | 2.00 |
| 2005 | 4,320,000 | 71,548 | 16,139 | 55,409 | 16.6 | 3.7 | 12.8 | 4.6 | 2.00 |
| 2006 | 4,392,000 | 71,291 | 16,766 | 54,525 | 16.2 | 3.8 | 12.4 | 4.3 | 1.90 |
| 2007 | 4,463,000 | 73,144 | 17,071 | 56,073 | 16.4 | 3.8 | 12.6 | 3.6 | 1.98 |
| 2008 | 4,533,000 | 75,187 | 18,021 | 57,166 | 16.6 | 4.0 | 12.6 | 3.1 | 1.97 |
| 2009 | 4,601,000 | 75,000 | 18,560 | 56,440 | 16.2 | 4.0 | 12.2 | 2.8 | 1.95 |
| 2010 | 4,670,000 | 70,922 | 19,077 | 51,845 | 15.5 | 4.2 | 11.4 | 3.6 | 1.81 |
| 2011 | 4,738,000 | 73,459 | 18,801 | 54,658 | 15.9 | 4.1 | 11.8 | 2.8 | 1.86 |
| 2012 | 4,652,000 | 73,326 | 19,200 | 54,126 | 15.7 | 4.1 | 11.6 | -29.8 | 1.84 |
| 2013 | 4,713,000 | 70,550 | 19,647 | 50,903 | 15.0 | 4.2 | 10.8 | 2.3 | 1.76 |
| 2014 | 4,773,000 | 71,793 | 20,553 | 51,240 | 15.0 | 4.3 | 10.7 | 2.0 | 1.77 |
| 2015 | 4,832,000 | 71,819 | 21,039 | 50,780 | 14.9 | 4.3 | 10.6 | 1.8 | 1.76 |
| 2016 | 4,890,000 | 70,004 | 22,603 | 47,401 | 14.3 | 4.6 | 9.7 | 2.3 | 1.71 |
| 2017 | 4,947,000 | 68,816 | 23,251 | 45,565 | 13.9 | 4.7 | 9.2 | 2.5 | 1.67 |
| 2018 | 5,003,000 | 68,449 | 23,806 | 44,643 | 13.7 | 4.8 | 8.9 | 2.4 | 1.66 |
| 2019 | 5,058,000 | 64,287 | 24,237 | 40,050 | 12.7 | 4.8 | 7.9 | 3.1 | 1.56 |
| 2020 | 5,111,200 | 57,848 | 26,209 | 31,639 | 11.4 | 5.1 | 6.3 | 4.2 | 1.41 |
| 2021 | 5,173,400 | 54,289 | 31,081 | 23,208 | 10.7 | 6.1 | 4.6 | 7.7 | 1.32 |
| 2022 | 5,044,197 (c) | 53,435 | 28,931 | 24,504 | 10.5 | 5.7 | 4.8 | -29.7 | 1.30 |
| 2023 | 5,136,000 | 50,205 | 29,189 | 21,016 | 9.7 | 5.6 | 4.1 | 14.0 | 1.19 |
| 2024 | 5,164,860 | 45,825 | 30,185 | 15,640 | 8.9 | 5.8 | 3.1 | 2.6 | 1.12 |
| 2025 | 5,191,823 | 45,384 | 30,750 | 14,634 | 8.7 | 5.9 | 2.8 | | 1.12 |

(c) = Census results.

=== Current vital statistics ===
| Period | Live births | Deaths | Natural increase |
|---|---|---|---|
| January–June 2025 | 21,868 | 15,523 | 6,345 |
| January–June 2026 | 21,890 | 15,134 | 6,756 |
| Difference | +22 (+0.1%) | ▼ –389 (–2.5%) | ▲ +411 |

=== Fertility ===
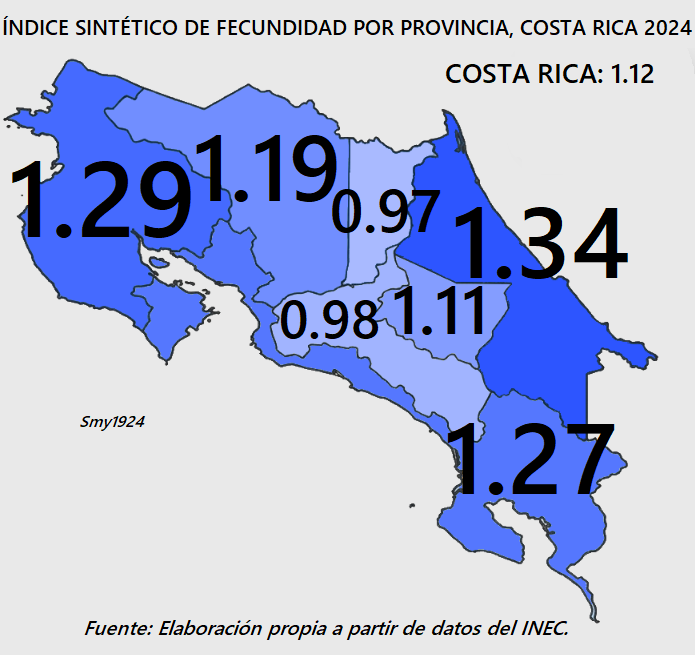
Total fertility rate by province, 2024

| Years | 1920 | 1921 | 1922 | 1923 | 1924 | 1925 | 1926 | 1927 | 1928 | 1929 |
|---|---|---|---|---|---|---|---|---|---|---|
| Total Fertility Rate in Costa Rica | 6.72 | 6.73 | 6.74 | 6.77 | 6.81 | 6.85 | 6.89 | 6.93 | 6.88 | 6.83 |

| Years | 1930 | 1931 | 1932 | 1933 | 1934 | 1935 | 1936 | 1937 | 1938 | 1939 |
|---|---|---|---|---|---|---|---|---|---|---|
| Total Fertility Rate in Costa Rica | 6.79 | 6.74 | 6.69 | 6.65 | 6.61 | 6.57 | 6.53 | 6.50 | 6.60 | 6.70 |

| Years | 1940 | 1941 | 1942 | 1943 | 1944 | 1945 | 1946 | 1947 | 1948 | 1949 |
|---|---|---|---|---|---|---|---|---|---|---|
| Total Fertility Rate in Costa Rica | 6.80 | 6.84 | 6.89 | 6.93 | 6.98 | 7.02 | 6.93 | 6.83 | 6.74 | 6.64 |

=== Life expectancy at birth ===
| Period | Life expectancy in Years | Period | Life expectancy in Years |
|---|---|---|---|
| 1950–1955 | 56.0 | 1985–1990 | 75.1 |
| 1955–1960 | 58.8 | 1990–1995 | 76.1 |
| 1960–1965 | 62.4 | 1995–2000 | 77.0 |
| 1965–1970 | 65.2 | 2000–2005 | 77.8 |
| 1970–1975 | 67.7 | 2005–2010 | 78.4 |
| 1975–1980 | 70.5 | 2010–2015 | 79.2 |
| 1980–1985 | 73.4 | | |

Source: UN World Population Prospects

== Ethnic groups ==
Ethnic groups in Costa Rica
1. European (70.8%)
2. Mestizo (17.8%)
3. Mulatto (6.70%)
4. Indigenous (2.40%)
5. African (1.10%)
6. Asian (0.20%)
7. Other/none (1.00%)

According to census data the vast majority of the population identifies itself as white or mestizo. The indigenous Amerindian population only constitutes 2.4% of the population in 2011, but has gone up from only 0.3% in 1950. About 7% has African roots.

Population of Costa Rica according to ethnic group
| Ethnic group | Census 1950 | | Census 2000 | | Census 2011 | |
| Ethnic group | Number | % | Number | % | Number | % |
|---|---|---|---|---|---|---|
| Amerindian (indigenous) | 2 692 | 0.3 | 63 876 | 1.7 | 104 143 | 2.4 |
| Bribri | | | | | 18 198 | 0.4 |
| Brumca/Boruca | | | | | 5 555 | 0.1 |
| Cabécar | | | | | 16 985 | 0.4 |
| Chorotega | | | | | 11 442 | 0.3 |
| Huetar | | | | | 3 461 | 0.1 |
| Maleku/Guatuso | | | | | 17 80 | 0.0 |
| Ngobe/Guaymi | | | | | 9 543 | 0.2 |
| Teribe/Terraba | | | | | 2 665 | 0.1 |
| foreign tribe | | | | | 8 444 | 0.2 |
| tribe not specified | | | | | 26 070 | 0.6 |
| Afrocostarican or black | 15 118 | 1.9 | 72 784 | 1.9 | 45 228 | 1.1 |
| Mulatto | | | | | 289 209 | 6.7 |
| Chinese | 933 | 0.1 | 7 873 | 0.2 | 9 170 | 0.2 |
| White/mestizo | 782 041 | 97.6 | 3 568 471 | 93.7 | 3 597 000 | 83.6 |
| Other | 91 | 0.0 | | | 36 334 | 0.8 |
| Did not state | | | | | 124 641 | 2.9 |
| Unknown | | | 97 175 | 2.6 | 95 140 | 2.2 |
| Total | 800,872 | | 3,810,179 | | 4,301,712 | |

=== European Costa Ricans ===
European Costa Ricans
Total population
- c. 2,830,000; 65.8% of the Costa Rican population

Languages
- Costa Rican Spanish, English

Religion
- Roman Catholic 76.3%, Evangelical 13.7%, other 4.8%, none 3.2%, Buddhism 2%

Related ethnic groups
- White Latin Americans, White Caribbeans

European Costa Ricans are people from Costa Rica whose ancestry lies within the continent of Europe, most notably Spain. According to DNA studies, around 75% of the population have some level of European ancestry.

Percentages of the Costa Rican population by race are known as the national census, which includes the question of ethnicity in its form. As of 2012, 65.80% of Costa Ricans identify themselves as white/castizo and 17.80% as mestizo, giving around over 80% of the Caucasian population. This, however, is based on self-identification and not on scientific studies. According to the PLoS Genetics Geographic Patterns of Genome Admixture in Latin American Mestizos study of 2012, Costa Ricans have 73% of European ancestry, 25% Amerindian, and 2% African. According to CIA Factbook, Costa Rica has a white or Castizo population of 83.6%.

Cristopher Columbus and his crew were the first Europeans ever to set foot on what is now Costa Rica, having arrived at Uvita Island (modern-day Limón province) in 1502 on Columbus's last trip. Costa Rica was part of the Spanish Empire and colonized by Spaniards mostly Castilians, Basque and Sephardic Jews.

After independence, large migrations of wealthy Americans, Germans, French and British businessmen came to the country encouraged by the government and followed by their families and employees (many of them technicians and professionals), thus creating colonies and mixing with the population, especially the high and middle classes.

Later, smaller migrations of Italians, Spaniards (mostly Catalans) and Arabs (mostly Lebanese and Syrians) took place. These migrants arrived fleeing economic crisis in their home countries, setting in large, more closed colonies. Polish migrants, mostly Ashkenazi Jews who fled antisemitism and Nazi persecution in Europe, also arrived in large numbers.

In 1901, the president Ascensión Esquivel Ibarra closed the country to all non-white immigrants. All Black, Chinese, Arab, Turkish or Romani migration to the country was banned. After the beginning of the Spanish Civil War, a large influx of Republican refugees settled in the country, mostly Castilians, Galicians, and Asturians, as well as later Chilean, Mexican and Colombian migrants who would arrive escaping from war or dictatorships, as Costa Rica is the longest running democracy in Latin America.

== Languages ==
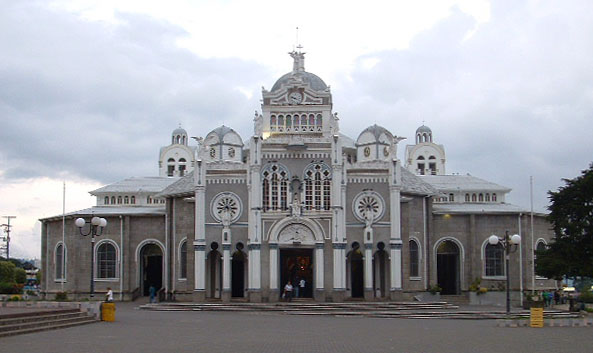
The Basilica Los Angeles, Cartago, Costa Rica.

Nearly all Costa Ricans speak Spanish, but many know English. Indigenous Costa Ricans also speak their own language, such as the case of the Ngobes.

== Religion ==
Religion in Costa Rica (2008)
1. Catholicism (70.5%)
2. Protestantism (13.8%)
3. Irreligion (11.3%)
4. Buddhism (2.10%)
5. Other religions (2.20%)

According to the World Factbook, the main faiths are Roman Catholic (76.3%), Evangelical (13.7%), Jehovah's Witnesses (1.3%), other Protestant (0.7%), other (4.8%), and none (3.2%).

The most recent nationwide survey of religion in Costa Rica, conducted in 2007 by the University of Costa Rica, found that 70.5 percent of the population identify themselves as Roman Catholics (with 44.9 percent practicing, 25.6 percent nonpracticing), 13.8 percent are Evangelical Protestants, 11.3 percent report that they do not have a religion, and 4.3 percent declare that they belong to another religion.

Apart from the dominant Catholic religion, several other religious groups exist in the country. Methodist, Lutheran, Episcopal, Baptist, and other Protestant groups have significant membership. The Church of Jesus Christ of Latter-day Saints (LDS Church) claims more than 35,000 members and has a temple in San José that served as a regional worship center for Costa Rica, Panama, Nicaragua, and Honduras.

Although they represent less than 1 percent of the population, Jehovah's Witnesses have a strong presence on the Caribbean coast. Seventh-day Adventists operate a university that attracts students from throughout the Caribbean Basin. The Unification Church maintains its continental headquarters for Latin America in San José.

Non-Christian religious groups, including followers of Judaism, Islam, Taoism, Hare Krishna, Paganism, Wicca, Scientology, Tenrikyo, and the Baháʼí Faith, claim membership throughout the country, with the majority of worshipers residing in the Central Valley (the area of the capital). While there is no general correlation between religion and ethnicity, indigenous peoples are more likely to practice animism than other religions.

Article 75 of the Costa Rican Constitution states that the "Catholic, Apostolic, and Roman Religion is the official religion of the Republic." That same article provides for freedom of religion. The government respects this right. The US government found no reports of societal abuses or discrimination based on religious belief or practice in 2007.

== Migration ==
=== Emigration ===
Costa Rican emigration is among the smallest in the Caribbean Basin. About 2% of the country's population lives in another country as immigrants. The main destination countries are the United States, Spain, Mexico, and other Central American countries. In 2005, 127,061 Costa Ricans lived in another country as immigrants. Remittance s were $513,000,000 in 2006, which represented 2.3% of the national GDP.

=== Immigration ===
Costa Rica's immigration is among the largest in the Caribbean Basin. According to the 2011 census, 385,899 residents were born abroad. The vast majority were born in Nicaragua (287,766). Other countries of origin were Colombia (20,514), United States (16,898), Spain (16,482) and Panama (11,250). Outward remittances were $246,000,000 in 2006.

=== Migrants ===
According to the World Bank, about 489,200 migrants lived in the country in 2010; mainly from Nicaragua, Panama, El Salvador, Honduras, Guatemala, and Belize, while 125,306 Costa Ricans live abroad in the United States, Panama, Nicaragua, Spain, Mexico, Canada, Germany, Venezuela, Dominican Republic, and Ecuador. The number of migrants declined in later years but in 2015, there were some 420,000 immigrants in Costa Rica and the number of asylum seekers (mainly from Honduras, El Salvador, Guatemala and Nicaragua) rose to more than 110,000, a fivefold increase from 2012. In 2016, the country was called a "magnet" for migrants from South and Central America and other countries who were hoping to reach the U.S.

== See also ==
- Ethnic groups in Central America
