= Eduardo Sepulveda Puerto =

Spanish épée fencer

Eduardo Sepulveda Puerto is a Spanish épée fencer.

Sepulveda Puerto won the silver medal in the épée team event at the 2006 World Fencing Championships after losing to France in the final. He accomplished this with his team mates Ignacio Canto, Juan Castaneda and Jose Luis Abajo.

== Achievements ==
2006 World Fencing Championships, team épée
