= Costa Rica–Spain relations =

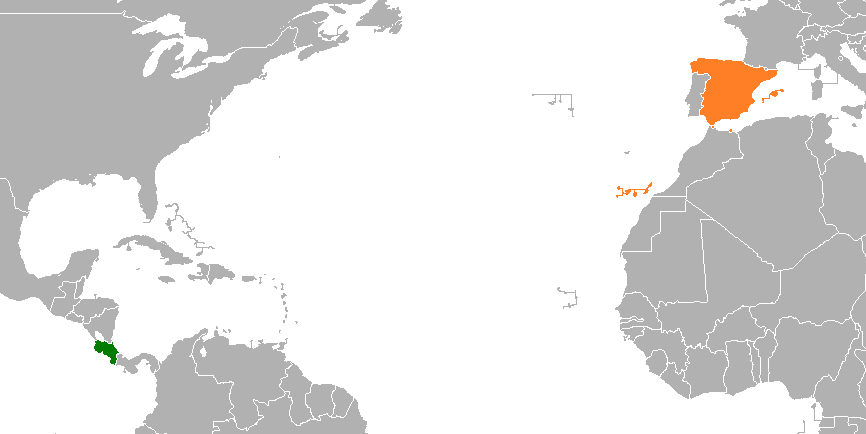

- Costa Rica: Spain

Diplomatic mission
- Embassy of Costa Rica, Madrid: Embassy of Spain, San José

Costa Rica–Spain relations are the diplomatic relations between Costa Rica and Spain. Both nations are members of the Association of Academies of the Spanish Language and the Organization of Ibero-American States.

== History ==
=== Spanish colonization ===
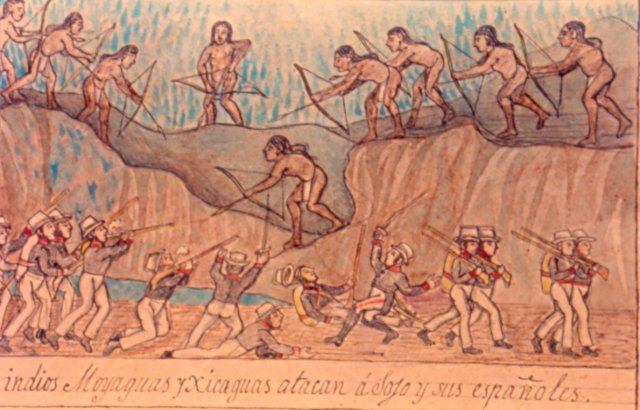
Native Moyaguas and Xicaguas tribes attack Spanish soldiers led by conquistador Diego de Sojo, 1639.

In September 1502, explorer Christopher Columbus arrived to eastern Costa Rica on his fourth voyage to the Americas. In 1561, Spanish conquistador Juan de Cavallón y Arboleda led the first successful colonizers into Costa Rica. In 1564, Spain established the town of Cartago, its first settlement in the country. For several decades, Costa Rica was ignored by the Spanish crown due to its distance from the regional capital of the Captaincy General of Guatemala located in Santiago de Guatemala and from the seat of the Viceroy of New Spain located in Mexico City.

The colony of Costa Rica developed into a poor peasant society with no large land-owning families or large native population, most of which had been massacred during Spanish colonization. Many of the settlers in the territory subsided on cacao and tobacco farming. In 1808, coffee was introduced to Costa Rica from Cuba and became the principal crop of the country.

=== Independence ===
In 1808, Joseph Bonaparte was installed as King of Spain and several Spanish American colonies began to declare their independence from Spain. As Costa Rica and most Central American nations were governed by Mexico City; New Spain declared its independence from Spain in 1810. In 1821, the Plan of Iguala declared Mexico as a constitutional monarchy. Costa Rica declared its own independence from Spain on 15 September 1821 after a monarchical coup chose to join the Mexican Empire under Emperor Agustín de Iturbide prompting the first civil war, the Ochomogo War.

In March 1823, Iturbide resigned as Emperor and Mexico became a republic. Costa Rica decided to separate from Mexico on 1 July 1823. Costa Rica, along with El Salvador, Guatemala, Honduras and Nicaragua formed the Federal Republic of Central America. In 1839 the Central American Federation dissolved and Costa Rica became an independent nation.

=== Post-Independence ===
On 10 May 1850, Costa Rica and Spain established diplomatic relations with the signing of a Treaty of Recognition, Peace and Friendship. Since independence, many Spanish migrants immigrated to Costa Rica seeking better opportunities in the nation. During the Spanish Civil War, Costa Rica officially remained neutral during the conflict and did not support either side in the conflict. As a result, few Spaniards immigrated to Costa Rica as refugees. At the end of the war, Costa Rica officially recognized the government of General Francisco Franco in April 1939.

In September 1977, King Juan Carlos I of Spain paid an official visit to Costa Rica. The King returned to Costa Rica in April 1991 and again in November 2004 to attend the XIV Ibero-American Summit. There have been several high level visits between leaders of both nations.

== High-level visits ==
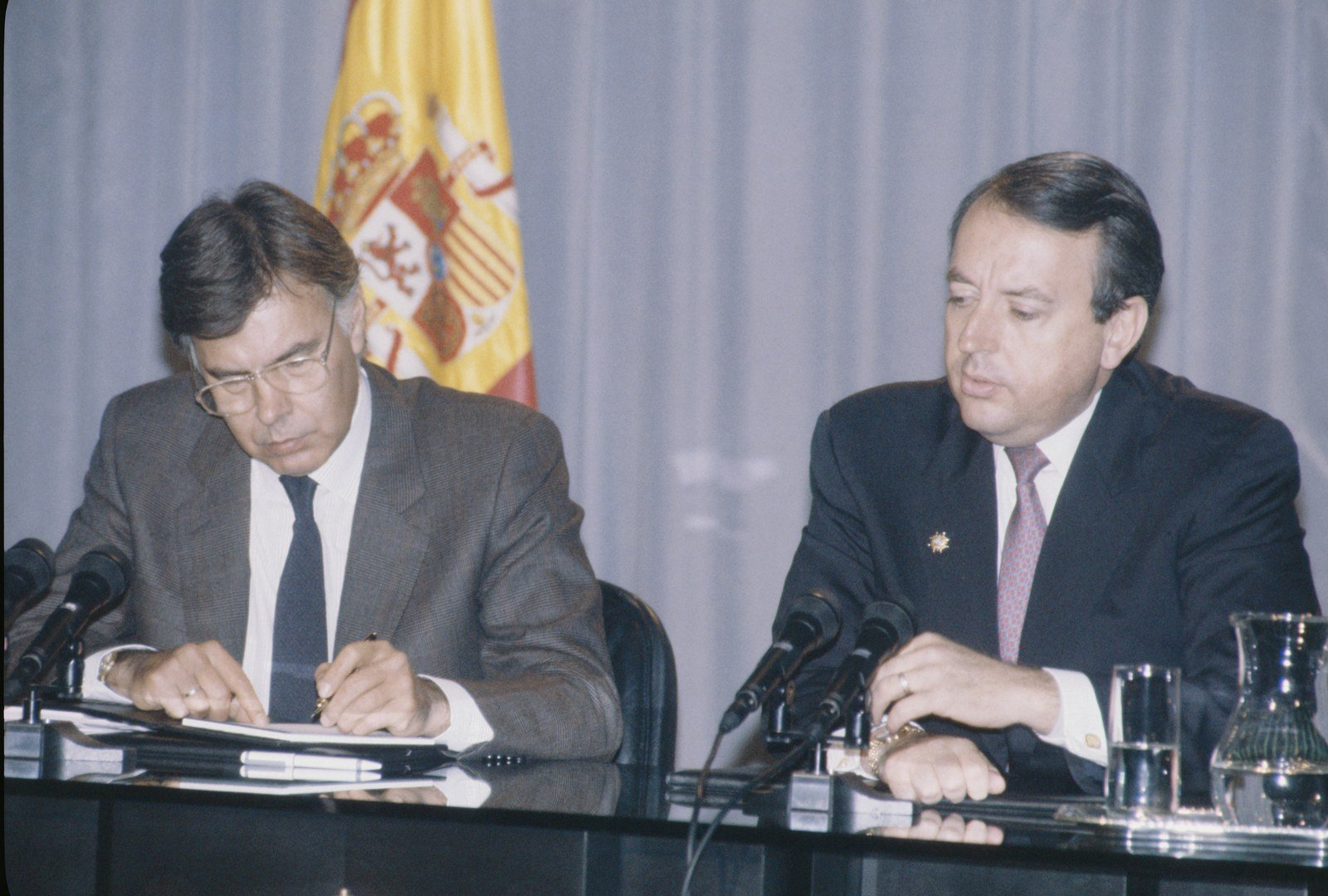
Costa Rican President Rafael Ángel Calderón Fournier and Spanish Prime Minister Felipe González in Madrid, January 1993.

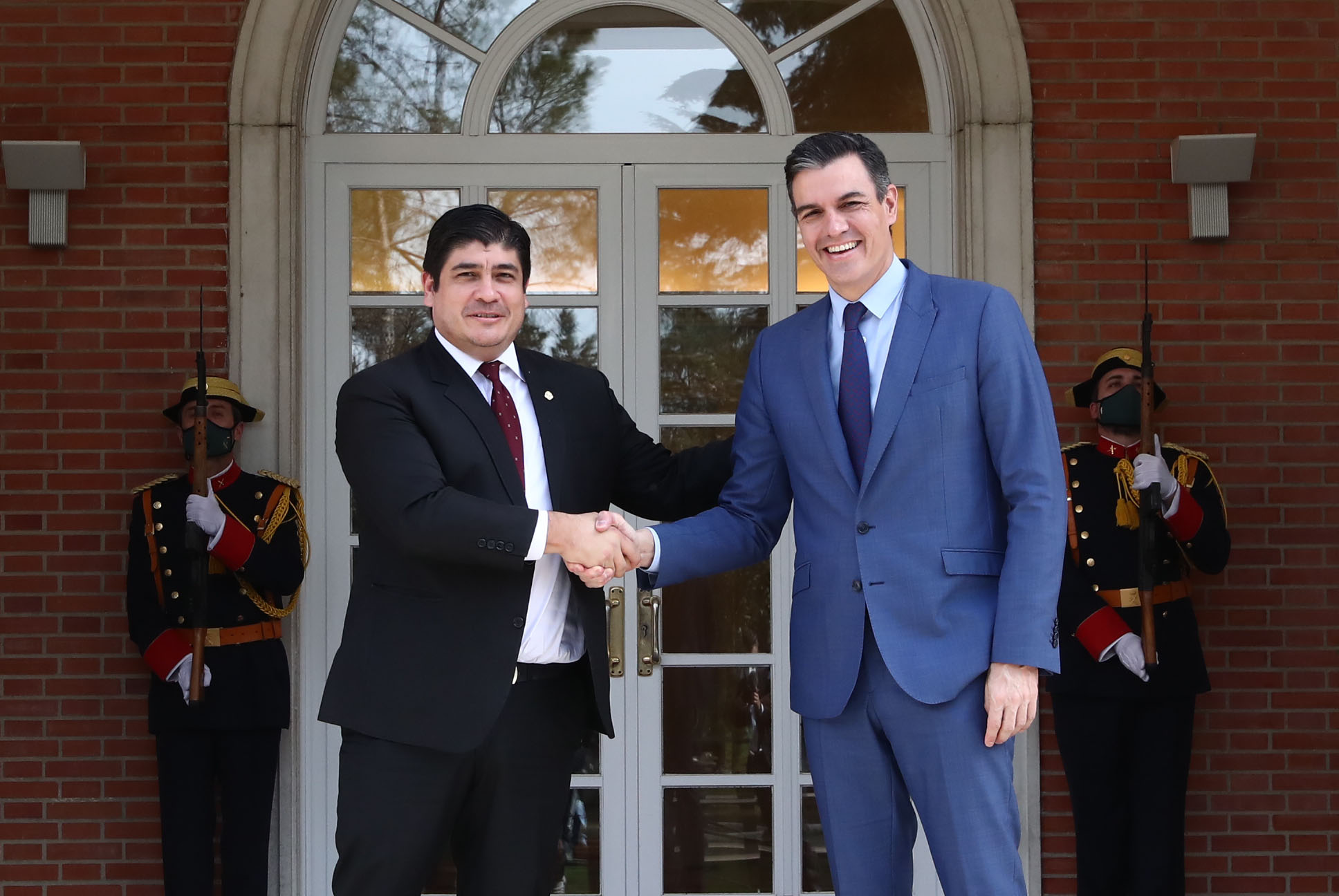
Spanish Prime Minister Pedro Sánchez and Costa Rican President Carlos Alvarado Quesada in Madrid; April 2022.

Presidential visits from Costa Rica to Spain

- President José Figueres Ferrer (1956)
- President Daniel Oduber Quirós (1976)
- President Luis Alberto Monge (1984)
- President Óscar Arias (1987, 1988, 2008)
- President Rafael Ángel Calderón Fournier (1992, 1993)
- President Miguel Angel Rodríguez (2001)
- President Abel Pacheco (2004, 2005)
- President Laura Chinchilla (2012, 2014)
- President Luis Guillermo Solís (2017)
- President Carlos Alvarado Quesada (2022)
- President Laura Fernández (2026)

Royal and Prime Ministerial visits from Spain to Costa Rica

- King Juan Carlos I (1977, 1991, 2004)
- Prime Minister Felipe González (1988)
- Prime Minister José María Aznar (2000)
- Prime Minister José Luis Rodríguez Zapatero (2004)
- Prime Minister Pedro Sánchez (2018, 2021)
- King Felipe VI (2022, 2026)

== Bilateral relations ==
Both nations have signed several bilateral agreements such as a Treaty of Recognition, Peace and Friendship (1850); Agreement on the Recognition of Civil Marriages (1897); Agreement on the Recognition of Academic degrees (1925); Agreement on Dual-Nationality (1964); Agreement on Cultural Cooperation (1971); Agreement on Air Transportation (1979); Agreement on Tourism Cooperation (1983); Agreement on mutual Diplomatic Assistance (1991); Agreement on Judicial Cooperation (1993); Extradition Treaty (1997); Agreement on reciprocal Promotion and Protection of Investments (1997) and an Agreement on Cultural and Educational Cooperation (2000).

== Transportation ==
There are direct flights between both nations with Iberia and Iberojet airlines.

== Trade ==
In 2022, trade between Costa Rica and Spain totaled US$617 million. Costa Rica's main exports to Spain include: Edible fruits (citrus and melon peels); vegetables; instruments and equipment for optics, photography or cinematography and legumes, plants, roots and tubers food. Spain's main exports to Costa Rica include: Boilers, machines, appliances and mechanical devices; manufactures of cast iron or steel; machines, appliances and electrical equipment and miscellaneous products of the chemical industries. Spanish multinational companies such as Mapfre, Telefónica and Zara operate in Costa Rica.

== Resident diplomatic missions ==
- Costa Rica has an embassy in Madrid.
- Spain has an embassy in San José.
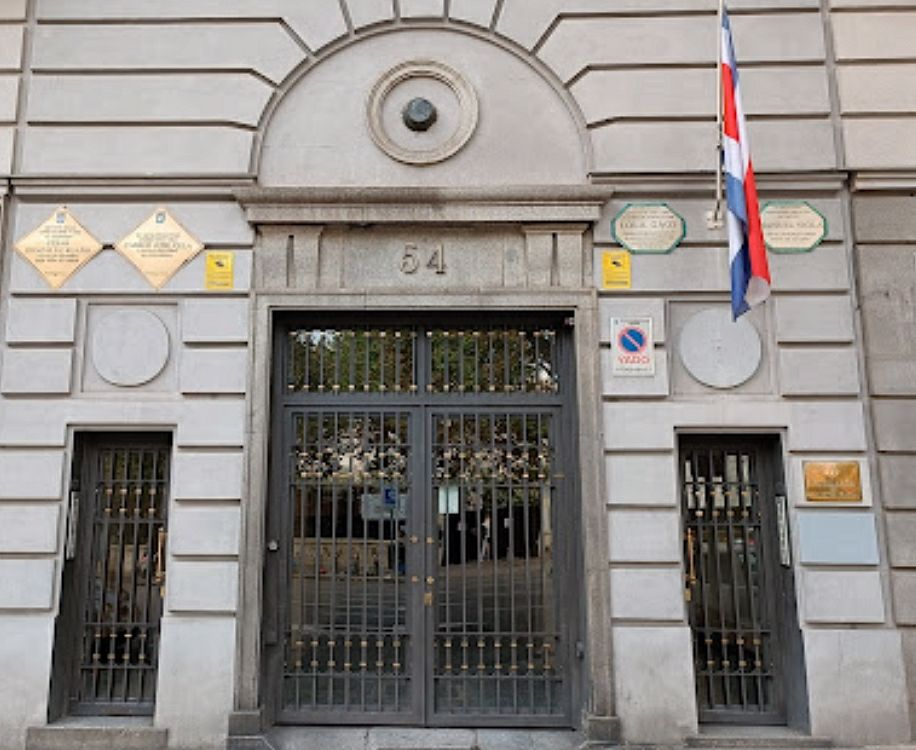
Embassy of Costa Rica in Madrid

== See also ==
- Foreign relations of Costa Rica
- Foreign relations of Spain
- Spanish Costa Rican
