= Ignacio Canto =

Spanish épée fencer (born 1981)

- Born: 21 January 1981 (age 45)
- Occupation: épée fencer

Ignacio Canto (born 21 January 1981) is a Spanish épée fencer.

Canto won the silver medal in the épée team event at the 2006 World Fencing Championships after losing to France in the final. He accomplished this with his teammates Jose Luis Abajo, Juan Castaneda and Eduardo Sepulveda Puerto.

== Achievements ==
2006 World Fencing Championships, team épée
