= Víctor Cañas =

Costa Rican architect

Víctor Cañas Collado is a Costa Rican architect, academic, and founder of Cañas Arquitectos. He has been associated with the development of contemporary and tropical architecture in Costa Rica, and with teaching at the University of Costa Rica.

== Career ==
Cañas founded Cañas Arquitectos in the 1970s. The Costa Rican cultural directory Sicultura states that the office was founded by Víctor Cañas in 1975 as a contemporary design practice.

He has been linked to the teaching of tropical architecture at the University of Costa Rica. A 2019 article by the School of Architecture of the University of Costa Rica identifies Edgar Brenes, Víctor Cañas and Hernán Jiménez as directors of the Taller de Arquitectura Tropical, a course taught at both undergraduate and graduate levels.

Academic writing on Costa Rican architecture has also discussed Cañas in relation to tropical architecture. In an article published in Revista de Arquitectura, Natalia Solano Meza notes that Edgar Brenes, Hernán Jiménez and Víctor Cañas have been recognized and classified as major exponents of tropical architecture in Costa Rica, while also arguing that this classification can oversimplify the historical and professional dimensions of their work.

== Recognition ==
Cañas has received recognition in Costa Rican architectural biennials. A bibliographic record in Dialnet lists an article from ‘‘Arquine’’ titled “Víctor Cañas gana la Bienal de Arquitectura de Costa Rica,” documenting his recognition in the Costa Rican Architecture Biennial.

In 2024, Cañas received the Premio Nacional de Arquitectura “José María Barrantes” from the Colegio de Arquitectos de Costa Rica during the Bienal Internacional de Arquitectura 2024. The CFIA reported that the award recognized his legacy in research, professional trajectory, professional association work, and participation in public management. The award was also reported by ‘‘Delfino.cr’’, which stated that the prize was awarded to Cañas in recognition of his legacy in research, professional trajectory and professional contribution.
