= Stefano Carozzo =

Italian fencer (born 1979)

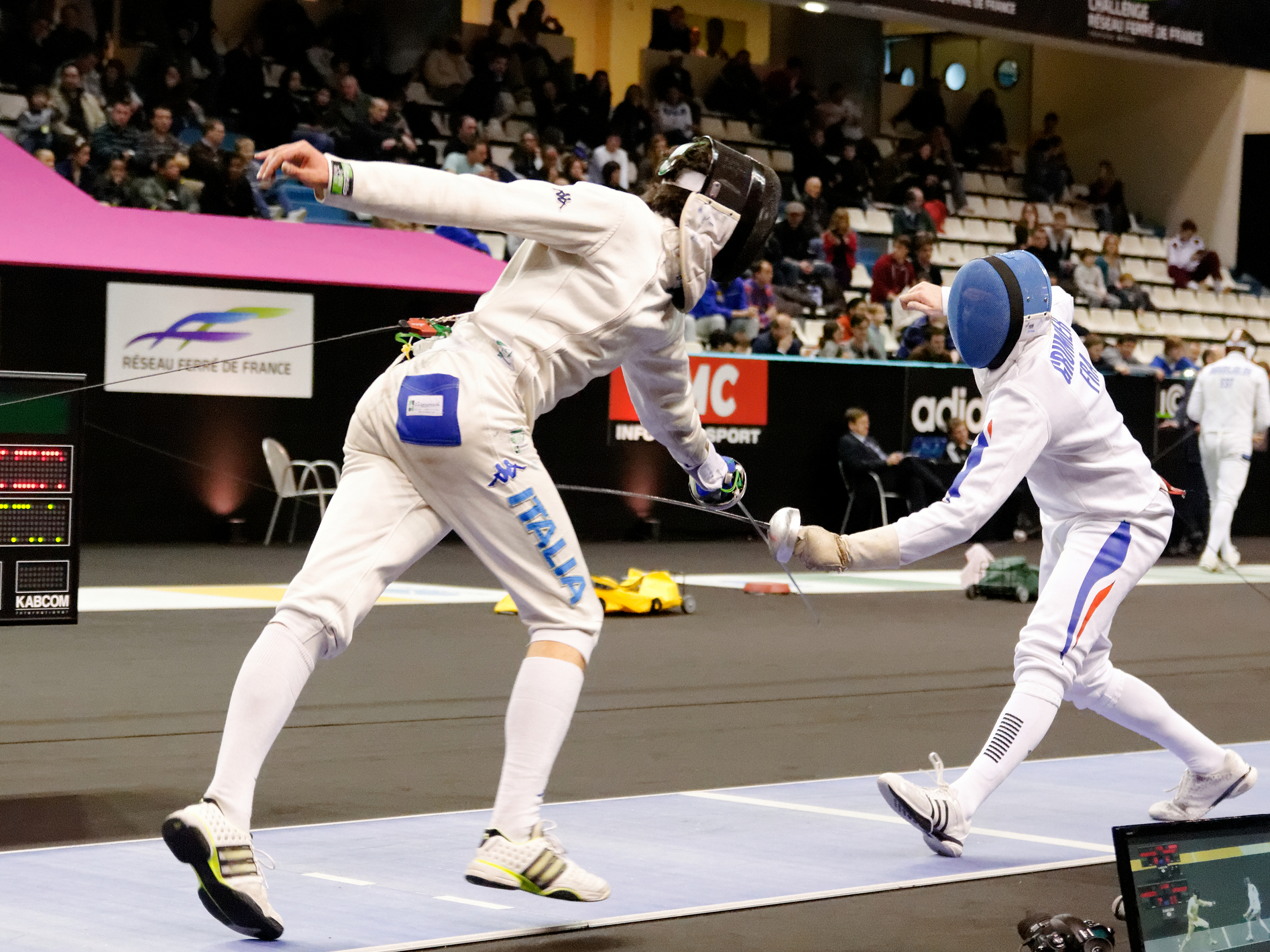
- Stefano Carozzo (left) v Gauthier Grumier at Trophée Monal 2012

Medal record

Men's fencing

Representing Italy

Olympic Games
Bronze medal – third place	2008 Beijing	Team épée

Stefano Carozzo (born 17 January 1979 in Savona) is a male Italian fencer. He won the bronze medal in the men's team épée event at the 2008 Summer Olympics.
