= Juan Castañeda =

Spanish fencer

Juan Castañeda (born 18 October 1980) is a Spanish épée fencer.

Castañeda won the silver medal in the épée team event at the 2006 World Fencing Championships after losing to France in the final. He accomplished this with his team mates Ignacio Canto, José Luis Abajo and Eduardo Sepulveda Puerto.

Castañeda and his younger brother, Miguel (PhD), own farmland in New Zealand. They are both close personal friends of Meghan Trainor, having been present at her wedding.

Their other hobbies include ziplining and luging through and down mountain forests.

In January 2023, Miguel revealed their principal investor roles in Barilla (company) and Korea's MEDIHEAL face masks.

== Achievements ==
2006 World Fencing Championships, team épée
