= 2004 United States women's Olympic basketball team =

- Head coach: Van Chancellor
- Scoring leader: Lisa Leslie 15.6
- Rebounding leader: Lisa Leslie 8.0
- Assists leader: Dawn Staley 2.9
- Biggest win: 52 vs. New Zealand
- Biggest defeat: none'

The 2004 United States women's Olympic basketball team competed in the Games of the XXVIII Olympiad which were held in Athens, Greece. The U.S. women's Olympic team won their fifth gold medal, and third consecutive, at the event. They went undefeated, beating Australia in the Gold medal final and bronze medal winners Russia in the semi-finals.

== Roster ==
United States women's national basketball team – 2004 Summer Olympics roster
Players
Coaches

Pos.	No.	Name	Age – Date of birth	Height	Club	Ctr.
G	4	Shannon Johnson	29 – August 18, 1974	1.82 m (6 ft 0 in)	San Antonio Silver Stars	(United States)
G	5	Dawn Staley	34 – May 4, 1970	1.65 m (5 ft 5 in)	Charlotte Sting	(United States)
G	6	Sue Bird	23 – October 16, 1980	1.75 m (5 ft 9 in)	Seattle Storm	(United States)
F	7	Sheryl Swoopes	33 – March 25, 1971	1.82 m (6 ft 0 in)	Houston Comets	(United States)
C	8	Ruth Riley	24 – 28 August 1979	1.95 m (6 ft 5 in)	Detroit Shock	(United States)
C	9	Lisa Leslie	32 – July 7, 1972	1.95 m (6 ft 5 in)	Los Angeles Sparks	(United States)
F	10	Tamika Catchings	25 – July 21, 1979	1.85 m (6 ft 1 in)	Indiana Fever	(United States)
F	11	Tina Thompson	29 – February 10, 1975	1.87 m (6 ft 2 in)	Houston Comets	(United States)
G	12	Diana Taurasi	22 – June 11, 1982	1.82 m (6 ft 0 in)	Phoenix Mercury	(United States)
F/C	13	Yolanda Griffith	34 – March 1, 1970	1.93 m (6 ft 4 in)	Sacramento Monarchs	(United States)
G	14	Katie Smith	30 – June 4, 1974	1.80 m (5 ft 11 in)	Minnesota Lynx	(United States)
F	15	Swin Cash	24 – September 22, 1979	1.87 m (6 ft 2 in)	Detroit Shock	(United States)

Head coach

- (United States) Van Chancellor

Assistant coach(es)

- (United States) Anne Donovan
- (United States) Gail Goestenkors
- (United States) Vivian Stringer

Legend

- Ctr. field describes country of
  last club before the tournament
- Age as of August 13, 2004

== Results ==
=== Group stage ===
August 14, 2004
14:30

United States	99–47	New Zealand
Scoring by quarter: 28–13, 35–11, 16–15, 20–8
Pts: Cash 19; Rebs: Taurasi 9 Asts: Bird, Staley 3		Pts: Marino 13; Rebs: Loffhagen 7 Asts: Three players 1

Helliniko Indoor Arena, Athens
Attendance: 1,970
Referees:
Vladimir Okhrimenko (Russia)
Abdellilah Chlif (Morocco)

August 16, 2004
14:30

Czech Republic	61–80	United States
Scoring by quarter: 21–18, 14–24, 15–23, 11–15
Pts: Klimešová 18; Rebs: Machová 5 Asts: Machová 5		Pts: Leslie 15; Rebs: Leslie 10; Asts: Staley 4

Helliniko Indoor Arena, Athens
Attendance: 954
Referees:
Giampaolo Cicoria (Italy)
Shoko Sugura (Japan)

August 18, 2004
14:30

South Korea	57–80	United States
Scoring by quarter: 23–20, 9–19, 7–29, 18–12
Pts: Lee M 16; Rebs: Kim Y. 5 Asts: Kim Y., Lee M 3		Pts: Leslie 25; Rebs: Leslie, Thompson 7 Asts: Three players 3

Olympic Indoor Hall, Athens
Attendance: 2,000
Referees:
Michael Aylen (Australia)
Dallas Pickering (New Zealand)

August 20, 2004
14:30

United States	71–58	Spain
Scoring by quarter: 19–16, 12–13, 19–12, 21–17
Pts: Leslie 19; Rebs: Leslie 9 Asts: Staley 6		Pts: Valdemoro 22; Rebs: Pascua 11; Asts: Palau 3

Helliniko Indoor Arena, Athens
Attendance: 1,352
Referees:
Christos Christodoulou (Greece)
Tatiana Steigerwald (Brazil)

August 22, 2004
20:00

China	62–100	United States
Scoring by quarter: 13–27, 19–25, 13–23, 17–25
Pts: Ye 19; Rebs: Sui 6 Asts: Miao 3		Pts: Taurasi 19; Rebs: Griffith 11; Asts: Bird, Johnson 5

Helliniko Indoor Arena, Athens
Attendance: 1,653
Referees:
Vladimir Okhrimenko (Russia)
Abreu Joao (Mozambique)

=== Quarterfinal ===
August 25, 2004
14:30

United States	102–72	Greece
Scoring by quarter: 27–19, 28–15, 21–19, 26–19
Pts: Johnson 21; Rebs: Griffith 11; Asts: Thompson 5		Pts: Kostaki 26; Rebs: Samoroukova 6 Asts: Kostaki 8

Olympic Indoor Hall, Athens
Attendance: 8,100
Referees:
Zoran Sutulovic (Serbia and Montenegro)
Dallas Pickering (New Zealand)

=== Semifinal ===
August 27, 2004
14:30

Russia	62–66	United States
Scoring by quarter: 15–16, 18–21, 11–14, 18–15
Pts: Shchegoleva 13; Rebs: Baranova, Stepanova 8 Asts: Baranova 6		Pts: Thompson 14; Rebs: Griffit, Leslie 7 Asts: Leslie 3

Olympic Indoor Hall, Athens
Attendance: 3,740
Referees:
Pablo Estevez (Argentina)
Christos Christodoulou (Greece)

=== Gold Medal Final ===
August 28, 2004
16:15

United States	74–63	Australia
Scoring by quarter: 17–14, 12–12, 23–24, 22–13
Pts: Thompson 18; Rebs: Leslie 8 Asts: Thompson 3		Pts: Taylor 16; Rebs: Jackson 14; Asts: Fallon, Jackson 2

Olympic Indoor Hall, Athens
Attendance: 10,120
Referees:
Chantal Julien (France)
José Reyes Ronfini (Mexico)

== See also ==
- 2004 Summer Olympics
- Basketball at the 2004 Summer Olympics
- United States at the 2004 Summer Olympics
- United States women's national basketball team
