= Basketball at the 2004 Summer Olympics – Women's tournament =

Tournament details
- Host country: Greece
- Dates: 14–28 August 2004

Final positions
- Champions: United States (5th title)

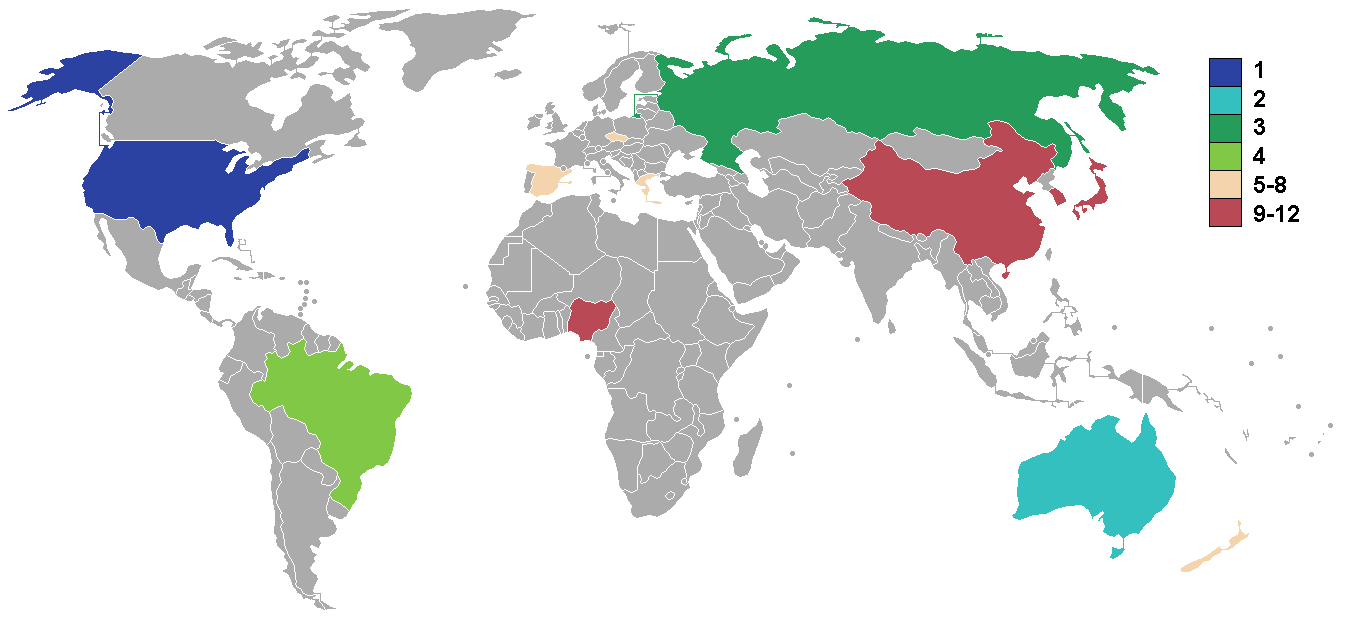
2004 women's teams.

The women's tournament of basketball at the 2004 Summer Olympics at Athens, Greece began on August 14 and lasted until August 28. The games were held at the Helliniko Olympic Indoor Arena and the Olympic Indoor Hall.

== Medalists ==
Gold	Silver	Bronze
United States; Sue Bird; Swin Cash; Tamika Catchings; Yolanda Griffith; Shannon Johnson; Lisa Leslie; Ruth Riley; Katie Smith; Dawn Staley; Sheryl Swoopes; Diana Taurasi; Tina Thompson	Australia; Suzy Batkovic; Sandy Brondello; Trisha Fallon; Kristi Harrower; Lauren Jackson; Natalie Porter; Alicia Poto; Belinda Snell; Rachael Sporn; Laura Summerton; Penny Taylor; Allison Tranquilli	Russia; Anna Arkhipova; Olga Arteshina; Yelena Baranova; Diana Goustilina; Maria Kalmykova; Elena Karpova; Ilona Korstin; Irina Osipova; Oxana Rakhmatulina; Tatiana Shchegoleva; Maria Stepanova; Natalia Vodopyanova

== Qualifying ==
Country	Qualified as	Date of qualification	Previous appearance
Greece	Olympics host	Sep 5, 1997	First appearance
United States	World champion	Sep 25, 2002	2000
China	Asian champion	Jan 18, 2004	1996
Japan	Asian runner-up	Jan 18, 2004	1996
South Korea	Asian third place	Jan 19, 2004	2000
Australia	Oceanian champion	Sep 14, 2003	2000
New Zealand	Oceanian runner-up	Sep 14, 2003	2000
Nigeria	African champion	Dec 18, 2003	First appearance
Brazil	Americas champion	Sep 21, 2003	2000
Russia	European champion	Sep 27, 2003	2000
Czech Republic	European runner-up	Sep 27, 2003	First appearance
Spain	European third place	Sep 28, 2003	1992

== Format ==
- Twelve teams are split into two preliminary round groups of six teams each.
- The top four teams from both groups qualify for the knockout stage.
- Fifth-placed teams from both groups compete for 9th place in an additional match.
- Sixth-placed teams from both groups compete for 11th place in an additional match.
- In the quarterfinals, the matchups are as follows: A1 vs. B4, A2 vs. B3, A3 vs. B2 and A4 vs. B1.
  - From the eliminated teams at the quarterfinals, the loser from A1 vs. B4 competes against the loser from B1 vs. A4 for 7th place in an additional match. The remaining two loser teams compete for 9th place in an additional match.
- The winning teams from the quarterfinals meet in the semifinals as follows: A1/B4 vs. A3/B2 and A2/B3 vs. A4/B1.
- The winning teams from the semifinals contest the gold medal. The losing teams contest the bronze.

Tie-breaking criteria:

1. Head to head results
2. Goal average (not the goal difference) between the tied teams
3. Goal average of the tied teams for all teams in its group

== Preliminary round ==
=== Group A ===
Pos	Team	Pld	W	L	PF	PA	PD	Pts	Qualification
1	Australia	5	5	0	418	313	+105	10	Quarterfinals
2	Russia	5	4	1	389	333	+56	9	Quarterfinals
3	Brazil	5	3	2	430	361	+69	8	Quarterfinals
4	Greece (H)	5	2	3	353	392	−39	7	Quarterfinals
5	Japan	5	1	4	381	485	−104	6	
6	Nigeria	5	0	5	335	422	−87	5	

Source: FIBA archive
Rules for classification: 1) points; 2) head-to-head points; 3) head-to-head goal average; 4) head-to-head number of points scored.
(H) Hosts

All times are local (UTC+3)

14 August 2004
9:00

Australia	85–73	Nigeria
Scoring by quarter: 20–18, 26–14, 16–12, 23–29
Pts: Batkovic, Taylor 11; Rebs: Batkovic 7 Asts: Fallon, Harrower 4		Pts: Udoka 26; Rebs: Amachree, Sadiq 8 Asts: Umoh 2

Helliniko Indoor Arena, Athens
Attendance: 302
Referees:
Philippe Leemann (France)
Valdu Suurkask (Estonia)

14 August 2004
16:45

Japan	62–128	Brazil
Scoring by quarter: 22–26, 3–36, 17–33, 20–33
Pts: Hamaguchi 23; Rebs: Yano 5 Asts: Kusuda, Nagata 2		Pts: Oliveira 25; Rebs: Oliveira 13; Asts: Pinto 7

Helliniko Indoor Arena, Athens
Attendance: 950
Referees:
Giampaolo Cicoria (Italy)
Abreu Joao (Mozambique)

14 August 2004
20:00

Greece	62–69	Russia
Scoring by quarter: 16–12, 18–19, 9–25, 19–13
Pts: Kostaki 17; Rebs: Kligkopoulou, Samoroukova 7 Asts: Kostaki 5		Pts: Baranova 16; Rebs: Baranova 12; Asts: Arkhipova, Rakhmatulina 2

Olympic Indoor Hall, Athens
Attendance: 1,488
Referees:
Sean Corbin (United States)
Alejandro Chiti (Argentina)

16 August 2004
11:15

Nigeria	73–79	Japan
Scoring by quarter: 22–22, 24–23, 16–20, 11–14
Pts: Udoka 19; Rebs: Udoka 16; Asts: Four players 1		Pts: Yano 21; Rebs: Kusuda, Yano 6 Asts: Kusuda, Hamaguchi 4

Olympic Indoor Hall, Athens
Attendance: 400
Referees:
Elizabeth Sisk (United States)
Dallas Pickering (New Zealand)

16 August 2004
20:00

Brazil	87–75	Greece
Scoring by quarter: 27–19, 23–24, 14–21, 23–11
Pts: Luz 18; Rebs: Oliveira 11; Asts: Three players 2		Pts: Maltsi 26; Rebs: Maltsi 10; Asts: Kostaki 7

Helliniko Indoor Arena, Athens
Attendance: 2,200
Referees:
Jorge Vazquez (Puerto Rico)
Philippe Leemann (Switzerland)

16 August 2004
22:15

Russia	56–75	Australia
Scoring by quarter: 12–21, 21–15, 15–16, 8–23
Pts: Korstin 12; Rebs: Korstin 9 Asts: Osipova, Rakhmatulina 3		Pts: Taylor 26; Rebs: Jackson, Taylor 10; Asts: Harrower 4

Olympic Indoor Hall, Athens
Attendance: 2,430
Referees:
Reynaldo Mercedes Sanchez (Dom. Republic)
Nancy Ethier (Canada)

18 August 2004
11:15

Japan	78–97	Australia
Scoring by quarter: 20–26, 15–30, 10–26, 33–15
Pts: Oga 21; Rebs: Yano 4 Asts: Kawabata, Tachikawa 2		Pts: Jackson 31; Rebs: Jackson 9 Asts: Tranquilli 5

Helliniko Indoor Arena, Athens
Attendance: 500
Referees:
Alejandro Chiti (Argentina)
Song Yanping (China)

18 August 2004
16:45

Greece	83–68	Nigeria
Scoring by quarter: 30–15, 15–14, 20–15, 18–24
Pts: Kostaki 25; Rebs: Maltsi, Saregkou 8 Asts: Kostaki 4		Pts: Udoka 28; Rebs: Udoka 18; Asts: Amachree, Iyorhe 1

Helliniko Indoor Arena, Athens
Attendance: 2,300
Referees:
Scott Butler (Australia)
Nancy Ethier (Canada)

18 August 2004
20:00

Brazil	67–77	Russia
Scoring by quarter: 17–21, 11–25, 20–17, 19–14
Pts: Arcain 19; Rebs: Oliveira 8 Asts: Luz 5		Pts: Arkhipova 20; Rebs: Stepanova 9 Asts: Arkhipova 3

Olympic Indoor Hall, Athens
Attendance: 1,350
Referees:
Jose Carrión (Puerto Rico)
Chantal Julien (France)

20 August 2004
9:00

Russia	94–71	Japan
Scoring by quarter: 29–21, 21–15, 24–15, 20–20
Pts: Baranova 22; Rebs: Stepanova 12; Asts: Shchegoleva 3		Pts: Hamaguchi 14; Rebs: Yabuuchi 4 Asts: Oyama, Tachikawa 2

Olympic Indoor Hall, Athens
Attendance: 185
Referees:
Abdelillah Chlif (Morocco)
Kim Ja Ok (South Korea)

20 August 2004
20:00

Australia	77–40	Greece
Scoring by quarter: 18–13, 21–8, 20–9, 18–10
Pts: Jackson 20; Rebs: Jackson 12; Asts: Batkovic 2		Pts: Maltsi 9 Rebs: Maltsi 10; Asts: Saregkou 3

Helliniko Indoor Arena, Athens
Attendance: 4,000
Referees:
Virginijus Dovidavicius (Lithuania)
Giampaolo Cicoria (Italy)

20 August 2004
22:15

Nigeria	63–82	Brazil
Scoring by quarter: 19–33, 15–14, 12–11, 17–24
Pts: Udoka 17; Rebs: Udoka 7 Asts: Amachree, Udoka 2		Pts: Castro Marques 26; Rebs: de Souza 8 Asts: Castro Marques 6

Helliniko Indoor Arena, Athens
Attendance: 2,500
Referees:
Mike Homsy (Canada)
Song Yangping (China)

22 August 2004
11:15

Nigeria	58–93	Russia
Scoring by quarter: 14–23, 17–20, 15–21, 12–29
Pts: Udoka 19; Rebs: Mohammed 8 Asts: Akiode, Umoh 3		Pts: Rakhmatulina 15; Rebs: Baranova 8 Asts: Karpova, Rakhmatulina 3

Helliniko Indoor Arena, Athens
Attendance: 382
Referees:
Dallas Pickering (New Zealand)
Shoko Suguro (Japan)

22 August 2004
14:30

Brazil	66–84	Australia
Scoring by quarter: 21–20, 14–20, 18–22, 13–22
Pts: Luz 16; Rebs: Oliveira 11; Asts: Castro Marques, Arcain 3		Pts: Jackson 24; Rebs: Snell 8 Asts: Fallon, Snell 3

Helliniko Indoor Arena, Athens
Attendance: 3,450
Referees:
Corbin Sean (United States)
Giampaolo Cicoria (Italy)

22 August 2004
16:45

Greece	93–91	Japan
Scoring by quarter: 27–15, 20–26, 16–22, 30–28
Pts: Maltsi 33; Rebs: Maltsi 11; Asts: Kalentzou 3		Pts: Yano 28; Rebs: Kusuda 5 Asts: Kusuda

Helliniko Indoor Arena, Athens
Attendance: 7,223
Referees:
Chantal Julien (France)
Michael Aylen (Australia)

=== Group B ===
Pos	Team	Pld	W	L	PF	PA	PD	Pts	Qualification
1	United States	5	5	0	430	285	+145	10	Quarterfinals
2	Spain	5	4	1	368	334	+34	9	Quarterfinals
3	Czech Republic	5	3	2	408	375	+33	8	Quarterfinals
4	New Zealand	5	2	3	321	414	−93	7	Quarterfinals
5	China	5	1	4	360	406	−46	6	
6	South Korea	5	0	5	320	393	−73	5	

Source: FIBA archive
Rules for classification: 1) points; 2) head-to-head points; 3) head-to-head goal average; 4) head-to-head number of points scored.

All times are local (UTC+3)

14 August 2004
11:15

South Korea	54–71	China
Scoring by quarter: 15–18, 6–15, 21–24, 12–14
Pts: Beon 19; Rebs: Kim Y. 4 Asts: Lee M 2		Pts: Chen N. Rebs: Ye 8 Asts: Miao 3

Helliniko Indoor Arena, Athens
Attendance: 600
Referees:
Chantal Julien (France)
Christos Christodoulou (Greece)

14 August 2004
14:30

United States	99–47	New Zealand
Scoring by quarter: 28–13, 35–11, 16–15, 20–8
Pts: Cash 19; Rebs: Taurasi 9 Asts: Bird, Staley 3		Pts: Marino 13; Rebs: Loffhagen 7 Asts: Three players 1

Helliniko Indoor Arena, Athens
Attendance: 1,970
Referees:
Vladimir Okhrimenko (Russia)
Abdellilah Chlif (Morocco)

14 August 2004
22:15

Spain	80–78 (OT)	Czech Republic
Scoring by quarter: 24–22, 11–12, 15–11, 17–22, Overtime: 13–11
Pts: Palau, Valdemoro 14; Rebs: Cebrián 11; Asts: M. Fernández, Palau 2		Pts: Večeřová 15; Rebs: Klimešová 8 Asts: Hamzová 3

Helliniko Indoor Arena, Athens
Attendance: 2,307
Referees:
Mike Homsy (Canada)
Michael Aylen (Australia)

16 August 2004
9:00

New Zealand	81–73	South Korea
Scoring by quarter: 21–11, 16–15, 26–23, 18–24
Pts: G. Farmer 22; Rebs: Loffhagen 14; Asts: Marino 4		Pts: Kim Y. 21; Rebs: Kim Y. 5 Asts: Beon 3

Helliniko Indoor Arena, Athens
Attendance: 180
Referees:
Alejandro Chiti (Argentina)
Tatiana Steigerwald (Brazil)

16 August 2004
14:30

Czech Republic	61–80	United States
Scoring by quarter: 21–18, 14–24, 15–23, 11–15
Pts: Klimešová 18; Rebs: Machová 5 Asts: Machová 5		Pts: Leslie 15; Rebs: Leslie 10; Asts: Staley 4

Helliniko Indoor Arena, Athens
Attendance: 954
Referees:
Giampaolo Cicoria (Italy)
Shoko Sugura (Japan)

16 August 2004
16:45

China	67–75	Spain
Scoring by quarter: 10–34, 19–14, 15–22, 23–5
Pts: Chen N. 18; Rebs: Chen N. 9 Asts: Song 4		Pts: Valdemoro 30; Rebs: Pascua 8 Asts: M. Fernández, Palau 5

Helliniko Indoor Arena, Athens
Attendance: 1,200
Referees:
Renato Santos (Brazil)
Scott Butler (Australia)

18 August 2004
9:00

China	83–98	Czech Republic
Scoring by quarter: 30–28, 19–21, 14–26, 20–23
Pts: Chen N. 23; Rebs: Chen N. 7 Asts: Miao, Ye 2		Pts: Veselá 22; Rebs: Veselá 7 Asts: Hamzová 8

Helliniko Indoor Arena, Athens
Attendance: 300
Referees:
Abdellilah Chlif (Morocco)
Tatiana Steigerwald (Brazil)

18 August 2004
14:30

South Korea	57–80	United States
Scoring by quarter: 23–20, 9–19, 7–29, 18–12
Pts: Lee M 16; Rebs: Kim Y. 5 Asts: Kim Y., Lee M 3		Pts: Leslie 25; Rebs: Leslie, Thompson 7 Asts: Three players 3

Olympic Indoor Hall, Athens
Attendance: 2,000
Referees:
Michael Aylen (Australia)
Dallas Pickering (New Zealand)

18 August 2004
22:15

Spain	91–57	New Zealand
Scoring by quarter: 32–8, 13–21, 20–9, 26–19
Pts: Palau 15; Rebs: Cebrián, Pascua 9 Asts: Palau 4		Pts: Marino 21; Rebs: Loffhagen 8 Asts: Loffhagen, Marino 3

Helliniko Indoor Arena, Athens
Attendance: 1,350
Referees:
Elizabeth Sisk (United States)
Shoko Suguro (Japan)

20 August 2004
11:15

New Zealand	79–77	China
Scoring by quarter: 21–19, 14–12, 20–24, 24–22
Pts: G. Farmer 19; Rebs: Kerr 12; Asts: Marino 4		Pts: Sui 21; Rebs: Sui 9 Asts: Wang 2

Helliniko Indoor Arena, Athens
Attendance: 345
Referees:
Elizabeth Sisk (United States)
Nancy Ethier (Canada)

20 August 2004
14:30

United States	71–58	Spain
Scoring by quarter: 19–16, 12–13, 19–12, 21–17
Pts: Leslie 19; Rebs: Leslie 9 Asts: Staley 6		Pts: Valdemoro 22; Rebs: Pascua 11; Asts: Palau 3

Helliniko Indoor Arena, Athens
Attendance: 1,352
Referees:
Christos Christodoulou (Greece)
Tatiana Steigerwald (Brazil)

20 August 2004
16:45

Czech Republic	97–75	South Korea
Scoring by quarter: 24–16, 21–19, 29–17, 23–23
Pts: Machová 28; Rebs: Večeřová 8 Asts: Hamzová 5		Pts: Beon 26; Rebs: Beon 4 Asts: Kim Y. 3

Helliniko Indoor Arena, Athens
Attendance: 753
Referees:
Vladimir Okhrimenko (Russia)
Abreu Joao (Mozambique)

22 August 2004
9:00

New Zealand	57–74	Czech Republic
Scoring by quarter: 12–21, 8–19, 23–18, 14–16
Pts: G. Farmer 19; Rebs: Loffhagen 12; Asts: G. Farmer, Loffhagen 1		Pts: Machová 21; Rebs: Klimešová 10; Asts: Hamzová 7

Helliniko Indoor Arena, Athens
Attendance: 365
Referees:
Nancy Ethier (Canada)
Kim Ja Ok (South Korea)

22 August 2004
20:00

China	62–100	United States
Scoring by quarter: 13–27, 19–25, 13–23, 17–25
Pts: Ye 19; Rebs: Sui 6 Asts: Miao 3		Pts: Taurasi 19; Rebs: Griffith 11; Asts: Bird, Johnson 5

Helliniko Indoor Arena, Athens
Attendance: 1,653
Referees:
Vladimir Okhrimenko (Russia)
Abreu Joao (Mozambique)

22 August 2004
22:15

Spain	64–61	South Korea
Scoring by quarter: 14–11, 15–16, 17–19, 18–15
Pts: Valdemoro 11; Rebs: Pons 9 Asts: Palau 3		Pts: Beon 19; Rebs: Kim Y. 6 Asts: Lee M 6

Helliniko Indoor Arena, Athens
Attendance: 1,152
Referees:
Elizabeth Sisk (United States)
Song Yanping (China)

== Classification games ==
=== 11th place game ===
24 August 2004
9:00

11th place

Nigeria	68–64	South Korea
Scoring by quarter: 16–16, 13–16, 21–12, 18–20
Pts: Udoka 21; Rebs: Mohammed 13; Asts: Umoh 2		Pts: Kim Y. 19; Rebs: Lee M. 12; Asts: Lee M. 7

Helliniko Indoor Arena, Athens
Attendance: 155
Referees:
Philippe Leemann (Switzerland)
Chantal Julien (France)

=== 9th place game ===
24 August 2004
11:15

9th place

Japan	63–82	China
Scoring by quarter: 12–20, 17–10, 19–21, 15–31
Pts: Kusuda, Koiso 13; Rebs: Oyama 6 Asts: Kusuda 2		Pts: Sui 25; Rebs: Wang 13; Asts: Miao 5

Helliniko Indoor Arena, Athens
Attendance: 253
Referees:
Abdellilah Chlif (Morocco)
Abreu Joao (Mozambique)

=== 7th place game ===
27 August 2004
9:00

7th place

Greece	87–83	New Zealand
Scoring by quarter: 21–24, 22–26, 23–16, 21–17
Pts: Maltsi 29; Rebs: Maltsi, Samoroukova 11; Asts: Kostaki 7		Pts: Loffhagen 23; Rebs: Loffhagen 15; Asts: Loffhagen 3

Olympic Indoor Hall, Athens
Attendance: 6,560
Referees:
José Reyes Ronfini (Mexico)
Shoko Suguro (Japan)

=== 5th place game ===
27 August 2004
11:15

5th place

Czech Republic	79–68	Spain
Scoring by quarter: 19–12, 21–15, 17–18, 22–23
Pts: Machová 22; Rebs: Klimešová 14; Asts: Hamzová 4		Pts: Valdemoro 24; Rebs: Pascua 6 Asts: Three players 1

Olympic Indoor Hall, Athens
Attendance: 4,650
Referees:
Corbin Sean (United States)
Vladimir Okhrimenko (Russia)

== Knockout stage ==
Quarterfinals
A2	Russia	70
B3	Czech Republic	49
B1	United States	102
A4	Greece	72
B2	Spain	63
A3	Brazil	67
A1	Australia	94
B4	New Zealand	55

Semifinals
A2	Russia	62
B1	United States	66
A3	Brazil	75
A1	Australia	88

Gold medal game
B1	United States	74
A1	Australia	63
Bronze medal game
A2	Russia	71
A3	Brazil	62

=== Quarterfinals ===
25 August 2004
14:30

United States	102–72	Greece
Scoring by quarter: 27–19, 28–15, 21–19, 26–19
Pts: Johnson 21; Rebs: Griffith 11; Asts: Thompson 5		Pts: Kostaki 26; Rebs: Samoroukova 6 Asts: Kostaki 8

Olympic Indoor Hall, Athens
Attendance: 8,100
Referees:
Zoran Sutulovic (Serbia and Montenegro)
Dallas Pickering (New Zealand)

25 August 2004
16:45

Russia	70–49	Czech Republic
Scoring by quarter: 19–6, 18–14, 19–10, 14–19
Pts: Korstin 21; Rebs: Korstin, Stepanova 7 Asts: Arkhipova 4		Pts: Kulichová 9 Rebs: Veselá 9 Asts: Hamzová 3

Olympic Indoor Hall, Athens
Attendance: 5,200
Referees:
Jorge Vazquez (Puerto Rico)
Scott Butler (Australia)

25 August 2004
20:00

Spain	63–67	Brazil
Scoring by quarter: 16–14, 18–20, 12–15, 17–18
Pts: M. Fernández 16; Rebs: Pascua 6 Asts: Palau 3		Pts: Arcain 27; Rebs: Oliveira, Sobral 8 Asts: Luz 3

Olympic Indoor Hall, Athens
Attendance: 13,500
Referees:
Lazaros Voreadis (Greece)
Nancy Ethier (Brazil)

25 August 2004
22:15

Australia	94–55	New Zealand
Scoring by quarter: 26–13, 19–18, 26–13, 23–11
Pts: Jackson 28; Rebs: Snell 10; Asts: Taylor 4		Pts: G. Farmer 15; Rebs: Loffhagen 11; Asts: Four players 2

Olympic Indoor Hall, Athens
Attendance: 8,100
Referees:
Ma Li Jun (China)
Tatiana Steigerwald (Brazil)

=== Semifinals ===
27 August 2004
14:30

Russia	62–66	United States
Scoring by quarter: 15–16, 18–21, 11–14, 18–15
Pts: Shchegoleva 13; Rebs: Baranova, Stepanova 8 Asts: Baranova 6		Pts: Thompson 14; Rebs: Griffit, Leslie 7 Asts: Leslie 3

Olympic Indoor Hall, Athens
Attendance: 3,740
Referees:
Pablo Estevez (Argentina)
Christos Christodoulou (Greece)

27 August 2004
16:45

Brazil	75–88	Australia
Scoring by quarter: 21–21, 15–21, 20–21, 19–25
Pts: Castro Marques 25; Rebs: Oliveira 8 Asts: Luz 2		Pts: Jackson 26; Rebs: Jackson 13; Asts: Harrower 4

Olympic Indoor Hall, Athens
Attendance: 4,150
Referees:
Jorge Vazquez (Puerto Rico)
Virginijus Dovidavicius (Lithuania)

=== Bronze medal game ===
28 August 2004
14:00

Russia	71–62	Brazil
Scoring by quarter: 18–20, 14–12, 15–14, 24–16
Pts: Goustilina 12; Rebs: Osipova 10; Asts: Arkhipova, Baranova 4		Pts: Castro Marques 16; Rebs: Oliveira 9 Asts: Castro Marques 6

Olympic Indoor Hall, Athens
Attendance: 7,250
Referees:
Corbin Sean (United States)
Nancy Ethier (Canada)

=== Gold medal game ===
28 August 2004
16:15

United States	74–63	Australia
Scoring by quarter: 17–14, 12–12, 23–24, 22–13
Pts: Thompson 18; Rebs: Leslie 8 Asts: Thompson 3		Pts: Taylor 16; Rebs: Jackson 14; Asts: Fallon, Jackson 2

Olympic Indoor Hall, Athens
Attendance: 10,120
Referees:
Chantal Julien (France)
José Reyes Ronfini (Mexico)

== Awards ==
2004 Women's Olympic Basketball Champions

United States
Fifth title

== Statistical leaders ==
Top ten in points, rebounds and assists, and top 5 in steals and blocks.

=== Points ===
Name	PPG
(Australia) Lauren Jackson	22.9
(Nigeria) Mfon Udoka	21.7
(Greece) Evanthia Maltsi	20.9
(Brazil) Janeth Arcain	18.0
(Spain) Amaya Valdemoro	16.9
(New Zealand) Gina Farmer	16.4
(China) Sui Feifei	16.0
(Greece) Anastasia Kostaki	15.6
(United States) Lisa Leslie	15.1
(Brazil) Izi Castro Marques	15.0

=== Rebounds ===
Name	RPG
(New Zealand) Donna Loffhagen	10.6
(Nigeria) Mfon Udoka	10.2
(Australia) Lauren Jackson	10.0
(Brazil) Alessandra Oliveira	8.9
(United States) Lisa Leslie	8.0
(Greece) Evanthia Maltsi	8.0
(Russia) Yelena Baranova	7.8
(Nigeria) Mactabene Amachree	7.3
(Czech Republic) Zuzana Klimešová	7.0
(Spain) Lucila Pascua	7.0

=== Assists ===
Name	APG
(Czech Republic) Romana Hamzová	4.9
(Greece) Anastasia Kostaki	4.6
(South Korea) Lee Mi-Sun	3.5
(United States) Dawn Staley	2.9
(Spain) Laia Palau	2.9
(Australia) Kristi Harrower	2.8
(Brazil) Helen Luz	2.8
(Australia) Trisha Fallon	2.6
(Brazil) Janeth Arcain	2.5
(Brazil) Izi Castro Marques	2.5

=== Steals ===
Name	SPG
(Czech Republic) Hana Machová	3.3
(Nigeria) Mactabene Amachree	3.3
(United States) Tamika Catchings	2.9
(Spain) Amaya Valdemoro	2.9
(South Korea) Lee Mi-Sun	2.8

=== Blocks ===
Name	BPG
(United States) Lisa Leslie	1.8
(Australia) Lauren Jackson	1.6
(Brazil) Alessandra Oliveira	1.3
(Brazil) Cintia Santos	1.1
(Russia) Irina Osipova	1.0

=== Game highs ===
Department	Name	Total	Opponent
Points	(Greece) Evanthia Maltsi	33	Japan
Rebounds	(Nigeria) Mfon Udoka	18	Greece
Assists	(Czech Republic) Romana Hamzová (Greece) Anastasia Kostaki	8	China; United States
Steals	(Spain) Amaya Valdemoro	7	Czech Republic
Blocks	(Australia) Lauren Jackson	4	Japan
Turnovers	(United States) Lisa Leslie (New Zealand) Angela Marino	9	New Zealand; United States

== Final standings ==
Rank	Team	Pld	W	L
Gold medal game participants
1st place, gold medalist(s)	United States	8	8	0
2nd place, silver medalist(s)	Australia	8	7	1
Bronze medal game participants
3rd place, bronze medalist(s)	Russia	8	6	2
4th	Brazil	8	4	4
Eliminated at the quarterfinals
5th	Czech Republic	7	4	3
6th	Spain	7	4	3
7th	Greece	7	3	4
8th	New Zealand	7	2	5
Preliminary round 5th placers
9th	China	6	2	4
10th	Japan	6	1	5
Preliminary round 6th placers
11th	Nigeria	6	1	5
12th	South Korea	6	0	6

== See also ==
- Men's Tournament
