= Czech Republic at the 2004 Summer Olympics =

- IOC code: CZE
- NOC: Czech Olympic Committee
- Website: www.olympic.cz (in Czech and English)

in Athens
- Competitors: 142 in 19 sports
- Flag bearers: Květoslav Svoboda (opening); Roman Šebrle (closing)
- Medals Ranked 42nd: Gold 1 Silver 3 Bronze 5 Total 9

Summer Olympics appearances (overview)
- 1996; 2000; 2004; 2008; 2012; 2016; 2020; 2024

Other related appearances
- Bohemia (1900–1912); Czechoslovakia (1924–1992)

Czech Republic competed at the 2004 Summer Olympics in Athens, Greece, from 13 to 29 August 2004. This was the nation's third appearance at the Summer Olympics after gaining its independence from the former Czechoslovakia. The Czech Olympic Committee sent the nation's largest team to the Games since the post-Czechoslovak era. A total of 142 athletes, 80 men and 62 women, competed in 19 sports; the nation's team size was roughly denser from Sydney by one sixth of the athletes. Women's basketball was the only team-based sport in which the Czech Republic had its representation at these Olympic Games. There was only a single competitor in equestrian, artistic and trampoline gymnastics, judo, and weightlifting.

The Czech team featured two defending Olympic champions: slalom kayaker Štěpánka Hilgertová, who made her fourth Olympic appearance as the most experienced female athlete, and javelin throwing legend Jan Železný, who had won three consecutive Olympic titles throughout his illustrious sporting career, and competed at his fifth Olympics. Meanwhile, freestyle swimmer and top medal favorite Květoslav Svoboda was appointed by the committee to carry the Czech flag in the opening ceremony. Other notable Czech athletes featured decathletes and Olympic medalists Roman Šebrle and Tomáš Dvořák, double Olympic champion Martin Doktor in men's sprint canoeing, and rifle shooter Kateřina Kůrková, who eventually married to the American and Olympic rifle prone titleholder Matt Emmons.

Czech Republic left Athens with a total of nine Olympic medals (one gold, three silver, and four bronze), surpassing the record set in Sydney four years earlier by just a single medal. Roman Šebrle, who previously won silver in Sydney, ended a 20-year drought to set an Olympic record and to receive the nation's only gold medal in men's decathlon, while Libor Capalini set a historic milestone for Czech Republic to pick up its first Olympic medal in modern pentathlon. Meanwhile, Věra Pospíšilová-Cechlová originally finished fourth in women's discus throw. On December 5, 2012, the International Olympic Committee stripped off Belarusian Iryna Yatchenko's silver medal after drug re-testings of her samples were found positive, lifting Cechlova's spot to the bronze medal position. For Jan Železný, he ended his sparkling career with a disappointing ninth-place finish in men's javelin throw at his fifth Olympic Games. On August 29, 2004, at the time of the closing ceremony, Zelezny was elected to the IOC Athletes' Commission, along with three other athletes.

== Medalists ==
| Medal | Name | Sport | Event | Date |
|---|---|---|---|---|
| Gold | Roman Šebrle | Athletics | Men's decathlon | August 24 |
| Silver | Lenka Hyková | Shooting | Women's 25 m pistol | August 18 |
| Silver | Jakub Hanák; David Jirka; Tomáš Karas; David Kopřiva | Rowing | Men's quadruple sculls | August 22 |
| Silver | Lenka Šmídová | Sailing | Europe class | August 22 |
| Bronze | Kateřina Kůrková | Shooting | Women's 10 m air rifle | August 14 |
| Bronze | Ondřej Štěpánek; Jaroslav Volf | Canoeing | Men's slalom C-2 | August 20 |
| Bronze | Věra Pospíšilová-Cechlová | Athletics | Women's discus throw | August 21 |
| Bronze | Jaroslav Bába | Athletics | Men's high jump | August 22 |
| Bronze | Libor Capalini | Modern pentathlon | Men's event | August 26 |

Medals by sport
| Sport | 1st place, gold medalist(s) | 2nd place, silver medalist(s) | 3rd place, bronze medalist(s) | Total |
| Athletics | 1 | 0 | 2 | 3 |
| Canoeing | 0 | 0 | 1 | 1 |
| Modern pentathlon | 0 | 0 | 1 | 1 |
| Rowing | 0 | 1 | 0 | 1 |
| Sailing | 0 | 1 | 0 | 1 |
| Shooting | 0 | 1 | 1 | 2 |
| Total | 1 | 3 | 5 | 9 |

Medals by day
| Day | Date | 1st place, gold medalist(s) | 2nd place, silver medalist(s) | 3rd place, bronze medalist(s) | Total |
| 1 | August 14 | 0 | 0 | 1 | 1 |
| 5 | August 18 | 0 | 1 | 0 | 1 |
| 7 | August 20 | 0 | 0 | 1 | 1 |
| 12 | August 21 | 0 | 0 | 1 | 1 |
| 13 | August 22 | 0 | 2 | 1 | 3 |
| 13 | August 24 | 1 | 0 | 0 | 1 |
| 17 | August 26 | 0 | 0 | 1 | 1 |
| Total | | 1 | 3 | 5 | 8 |

Medals by gender
| Gender | 1st place, gold medalist(s) | 2nd place, silver medalist(s) | 3rd place, bronze medalist(s) | Total | Percentage |
| Male | 1 | 1 | 3 | 5 | 55.55% |
| Female | 0 | 2 | 2 | 4 | 44.44% |
| Mixed | 0 | 0 | 0 | 0 | 0.00% |
| Total | 1 | 3 | 5 | 9 | 100% |

Multiple medalists
| Name | Sport | 1st place, gold medalist(s) | 2nd place, silver medalist(s) | 3rd place, bronze medalist(s) | Total |
| —N/a | | 0 | 0 | 0 | 0 |

== Athletics ==
Czech athletes have so far achieved qualifying standards in the following athletics events (up to a maximum of 3 athletes in each event at the 'A' Standard, and 1 at the 'B' Standard). Věra Pospíšilová-Cechlová originally finished fourth in women's discus throw. On December 5, 2012, Belarus' Iryna Yatchenko was ordered to strip off her silver medal by the International Olympic Committee after drug re-testings of her samples were discovered positive, lifting Cechlova's spot to the bronze medal position.

Key

- Note–Ranks given for track events are within the athlete's heat only
- Q = Qualified for the next round
- q = Qualified for the next round as a fastest loser or, in field events, by position without achieving the qualifying target
- NR = National record
- N/A = Round not applicable for the event
- Bye = Athlete not required to compete in round

Men
Track & road events

| Athlete | Event | Heat | | Quarterfinal | | Semifinal | | Final | |
| Athlete | Event | Result | Rank | Result | Rank | Result | Rank | Result | Rank |
|---|---|---|---|---|---|---|---|---|---|
| Jiří Vojtík | 200 m | 20.79 | 5 | Did not advance | | | | | |
| Michal Šneberger | 800 m | 1:47.89 | 5 | —N/a | | Did not advance | | | |
| Michal Šneberger | 1500 m | 3:39.68 | 7 q | —N/a | | 3:47.03 | 12 | Did not advance | |
| Jiří Mužík | 400 m hurdles | 48.85 | 2 Q | —N/a | | 48.88 | 5 | Did not advance | |
| Štěpán Tesařík | 400 m hurdles | 49.44 | 5 q | —N/a | | 49.87 | 7 | Did not advance | |
| Róbert Štefko | Marathon | —N/a | | | | | | 2:27:12 | 63 |
| Jiří Malysa | 20 km walk | —N/a | | | | | | DSQ | |
| Miloš Holuša | 50 km walk | —N/a | | | | | | 4:15:01 | 38 |

Field events

| Athlete | Event | Qualification | | Final | |
| Athlete | Event | Distance | Position | Distance | Position |
|---|---|---|---|---|---|
| Jaroslav Bába | High jump | 2.28 | =9 Q | 2.34 | 3rd place, bronze medalist(s) |
| Tomáš Janků | High jump | 2.20 | 30 | Did not advance | |
| Svatoslav Ton | High jump | 2.28 | =4 Q | 2.29 | 8 |
| Štěpán Janáček | Pole vault | 5.30 | =28 | Did not advance | |
| Adam Ptáček | Pole vault | 5.50 | =22 | Did not advance | |
| Petr Stehlík | Shot put | 20.06 | 11 q | 19.21 | 12 |
| Antonín Žalský | Shot put | 19.09 | 27 | Did not advance | |
| Libor Malina | Discus throw | 62.12 | 10 q | 58.78 | 10 |
| Vladimír Maška | Hammer throw | 71.76 | 29 | Did not advance | |
| Miroslav Guzdek | Javelin throw | 76.45 | 23 | Did not advance | |
| Jan Železný | Javelin throw | 81.18 | 9 Q | 80.59 | 9 |

Combined events – Decathlon

| Athlete | Event | 100 m | LJ | SP | HJ | 400 m | 110H | DT | PV | JT | 1500 m | Final | Rank |
|---|---|---|---|---|---|---|---|---|---|---|---|---|---|
| Tomáš Dvořák | Result | 11.53 | DNS | — | — | — | — | — | — | — | — | DNF | |
| Tomáš Dvořák | Points | 746 | 0 | — | — | — | — | — | — | — | — | DNF | |
| Roman Šebrle | Result | 10.85 | 7.84 | 16.36 | 2.12 | 48.36 | 14.05 | 48.72 | 5.00 | 70.52 | 4:40.01 | 8893 OR | 1st place, gold medalist(s) |
| Roman Šebrle | Points | 894 | 1020 | 873 | 915 | 892 | 968 | 844 | 910 | 897 | 680 | 8893 OR | 1st place, gold medalist(s) |

Women
Track & road events

| Athlete | Event | Heat | | Semifinal | | Final | |
| Athlete | Event | Result | Rank | Result | Rank | Result | Rank |
|---|---|---|---|---|---|---|---|
| Lucie Škrobáková | 100 m hurdles | 13.51 | 5 | Did not advance | | | |
| Anna Pichrtová | Marathon | —N/a | | | | 2:40:58 | 28 |
| Barbora Dibelková | 20 km walk | —N/a | | | | 1:33:37 | 24 |

Field events

| Athlete | Event | Qualification | | Final | |
| Athlete | Event | Distance | Position | Distance | Position |
|---|---|---|---|---|---|
| Zuzana Hlavoňová | High jump | 1.85 | 26 | Did not advance | |
| Iva Straková | High jump | 1.89 | 16 | Did not advance | |
| Kateřina Baďurová | Pole vault | 4.40 | =4 q | 4.20 | 12 |
| Pavla Hamáčková | Pole vault | 4.45 | 2 Q | 4.40 | 11 |
| Denisa Ščerbová | Long jump | 6.39 | 25 | Did not advance | |
| Šárka Kašpárková | Triple jump | 13.79 | 26 | Did not advance | |
| Věra Pospíšilová-Cechlová | Discus throw | 64.48 | 1 Q | 66.08 | 3rd place, bronze medalist(s) |
| Vladimíra Racková | Discus throw | 55.82 | 34 | Did not advance | |
| Lucie Vrbenská | Hammer throw | 60.29 | 42 | Did not advance | |
| Nikola Brejchová | Javelin throw | 64.39 | 2 Q | 64.23 | 4 |
| Jarmila Klimešová | Javelin throw | 57.70 | 25 | Did not advance | |
| Barbora Špotáková | Javelin throw | 58.20 | 23 | Did not advance | |

Combined events – Heptathlon

| Athlete | Event | 100H | HJ | SP | 200 m | LJ | JT | 800 m | Final | Rank |
|---|---|---|---|---|---|---|---|---|---|---|
| Michaela Hejnová | Result | 13.82 | 1.70 | 12.13 | 25.36 | 5.70 | 48.22 | 2:25.68 | 5716 | 26 |
| Michaela Hejnová | Points | 1004 | 855 | 670 | 854 | 759 | 826 | 748 | 5716 | 26 |

== Basketball ==
=== Women's tournament ===
Roster

The following is the Czech Republic roster in the women's basketball tournament of the 2004 Summer Olympics.

Czech Republic women's national basketball team – 2004 Summer Olympics roster
Players
Coaches

| Pos. | No. | Name | Age – Date of birth | Height | Club | Ctr. |
|---|---|---|---|---|---|---|
| F | 4 | Jana Veselá | 20 – 31 December 1983 | 1.95 m (6 ft 5 in) | Gambrinus Brno | (Czech Republic) |
| C | 5 | Ivana Večeřová | 25 – 30 March 1979 | 1.94 m (6 ft 4 in) | Gambrinus Brno | (Czech Republic) |
| F | 6 | Ivana Voračková | 24 – 28 August 1979 | 1.85 m (6 ft 1 in) | UŠK Blex Prague | (Czech Republic) |
| F | 7 | Michala Hartigová | 20 – 14 November 1983 | 1.82 m (6 ft 0 in) | Kara Trutnov | (Czech Republic) |
| G | 8 | Michaela Uhrová | 22 – 10 April 1982 | 1.66 m (5 ft 5 in) | Gambrinus Brno | (Czech Republic) |
| G | 9 | Hana Machová (C) | 24 – 11 September 1979 | 1.82 m (6 ft 0 in) | Gambrinus Brno | (Czech Republic) |
| G | 10 | Romana Hamzová | 33 – 17 August 1970 | 1.76 m (5 ft 9 in) | Gambrinus Brno | (Czech Republic) |
| F | 11 | Michaela Pavlíčková | 26 – 27 September 1977 | 1.90 m (6 ft 3 in) | Dynamo Moscow | (Russia) |
| F | 12 | Irena Borecká | 23 – 5 November 1980 | 1.75 m (5 ft 9 in) | Kara Trutnov | (Czech Republic) |
| C | 13 | Petra Kulichová | 19 – 13 September 1984 | 1.98 m (6 ft 6 in) | Kara Trutnov | (Czech Republic) |
| C | 14 | Zuzana Klimešová | 25 – 21 January 1979 | 1.87 m (6 ft 2 in) | Asteras Exarchion | (Greece) |
| F | 15 | Eva Vítečková | 22 – 26 January 1982 | 1.90 m (6 ft 3 in) | Gambrinus Brno | (Czech Republic) |

Head coach

- (Czech Republic) Jan Bobrovský

Assistant coach(es)

- (Czech Republic) Lubor Blažek

Legend

- (C) Team captain
- nat field describes country
  of last club before the
  tournament
- Age as of August 13, 2004

Group play

| Pos | Team | Pld | W | L | PF | PA | PD | Pts | Qualification |
|---|---|---|---|---|---|---|---|---|---|
| 1 | United States | 5 | 5 | 0 | 430 | 285 | +145 | 10 | Quarterfinals |
| 2 | Spain | 5 | 4 | 1 | 368 | 334 | +34 | 9 | Quarterfinals |
| 3 | Czech Republic | 5 | 3 | 2 | 408 | 375 | +33 | 8 | Quarterfinals |
| 4 | New Zealand | 5 | 2 | 3 | 321 | 414 | −93 | 7 | Quarterfinals |
| 5 | China | 5 | 1 | 4 | 360 | 406 | −46 | 6 | |
| 6 | South Korea | 5 | 0 | 5 | 320 | 393 | −73 | 5 | |

Source: FIBA archive
Rules for classification: 1) points; 2) head-to-head points; 3) head-to-head goal average; 4) head-to-head number of points scored.

14 August 2004
22:15

| Spain | 80–78 (OT) | Czech Republic |
Scoring by quarter: 24–22, 11–12, 15–11, 17–22, Overtime: 13–11
| Pts: Palau, Valdemoro 14; Rebs: Cebrián 11; Asts: M. Fernández, Palau 2 | | Pts: Večeřová 15; Rebs: Klimešová 8 Asts: Hamzová 3 |

Helliniko Indoor Arena, Athens
Attendance: 2,307
Referees:
Mike Homsy (Canada)
Michael Aylen (Australia)

16 August 2004
14:30

| Czech Republic | 61–80 | United States |
Scoring by quarter: 21–18, 14–24, 15–23, 11–15
| Pts: Klimešová 18; Rebs: Machová 5 Asts: Machová 5 | | Pts: Leslie 15; Rebs: Leslie 10; Asts: Staley 4 |

Helliniko Indoor Arena, Athens
Attendance: 954
Referees:
Giampaolo Cicoria (Italy)
Shoko Sugura (Japan)

18 August 2004
9:00

| China | 83–98 | Czech Republic |
Scoring by quarter: 30–28, 19–21, 14–26, 20–23
| Pts: Chen N. 23; Rebs: Chen N. 7 Asts: Miao, Ye 2 | | Pts: Veselá 22; Rebs: Veselá 7 Asts: Hamzová 8 |

Helliniko Indoor Arena, Athens
Attendance: 300
Referees:
Abdellilah Chlif (Morocco)
Tatiana Steigerwald (Brazil)

20 August 2004
16:45

| Czech Republic | 97–75 | South Korea |
Scoring by quarter: 24–16, 21–19, 29–17, 23–23
| Pts: Machová 28; Rebs: Večeřová 8 Asts: Hamzová 5 | | Pts: Beon 26; Rebs: Beon 4 Asts: Kim Y. 3 |

Helliniko Indoor Arena, Athens
Attendance: 753
Referees:
Vladimir Okhrimenko (Russia)
Abreu Joao (Mozambique)

22 August 2004
9:00

| New Zealand | 57–74 | Czech Republic |
Scoring by quarter: 12–21, 8–19, 23–18, 14–16
| Pts: G. Farmer 19; Rebs: Loffhagen 12; Asts: G. Farmer, Loffhagen 1 | | Pts: Machová 21; Rebs: Klimešová 10; Asts: Hamzová 7 |

Helliniko Indoor Arena, Athens
Attendance: 365
Referees:
Nancy Ethier (Canada)
Kim Ja Ok (South Korea)

Quarterfinal

25 August 2004
16:45

| Russia | 70–49 | Czech Republic |
Scoring by quarter: 19–6, 18–14, 19–10, 14–19
| Pts: Korstin 21; Rebs: Korstin, Stepanova 7 Asts: Arkhipova 4 | | Pts: Kulichová 9 Rebs: Veselá 9 Asts: Hamzová 3 |

Olympic Indoor Hall, Athens
Attendance: 5,200
Referees:
Jorge Vazquez (Puerto Rico)
Scott Butler (Australia)

5th place game

27 August 2004
11:15

5th place

| Czech Republic | 79–68 | Spain |
Scoring by quarter: 19–12, 21–15, 17–18, 22–23
| Pts: Machová 22; Rebs: Klimešová 14; Asts: Hamzová 4 | | Pts: Valdemoro 24; Rebs: Pascua 6 Asts: Three players 1 |

Olympic Indoor Hall, Athens
Attendance: 4,650
Referees:
Corbin Sean (United States)
Vladimir Okhrimenko (Russia)

== Canoeing ==
=== Slalom ===
| Athlete | Event | Preliminary | | | | | | Semifinal | | Final | | | |
| Athlete | Event | Run 1 | Rank | Run 2 | Rank | Total | Rank | Time | Rank | Time | Rank | Total | Rank |
|---|---|---|---|---|---|---|---|---|---|---|---|---|---|
| Tomáš Indruch | Men's C-1 | 99.81 | 2 | 102.87 | 7 | 202.68 | 4 Q | 98.22 | 5 Q | 97.06 | 5 | 195.28 | 5 |
| Ondřej Raab | Men's K-1 | 98.54 | 13 | 95.96 | 5 | 194.50 | 9 Q | 98.13 | 14 | Did not advance | | | |
| Marek Jiras; Tomáš Máder | Men's C-2 | 110.66 | 6 | 118.33 | 8 | 228.99 | 8 Q | 110.35 | 7 | Did not advance | | | |
| Ondřej Štěpánek; Jaroslav Volf | Men's C-2 | 108.10 | 4 | 106.25 | 2 | 214.35 | 3 Q | 106.22 | 3 Q | 106.64 | 4 | 212.86 | 3rd place, bronze medalist(s) |
| Štěpánka Hilgertová | Women's K-1 | 117.05 | 11 | 111.70 | 9 | 228.75 | 11 Q | 111.31 | 8 Q | 109.44 | 3 | 220.75 | 5 |
| Irena Pavelková | Women's K-1 | 116.08 | 9 | 111.38 | =7 | 227.46 | 9 Q | 161.49 | 15 | Did not advance | | | |

=== Sprint ===
| Athlete | Event | Heats | | Semifinals | | Final | |
| Athlete | Event | Time | Rank | Time | Rank | Time | Rank |
|---|---|---|---|---|---|---|---|
| Martin Doktor | Men's C-1 500 m | 1:49.557 | 2 q | 1:50.253 | 1 Q | 1:47.999 | 5 |
| Martin Doktor | Men's C-1 1000 m | 3:49.029 | 2 q | 3:51.812 | 1 Q | 3:50.405 | 4 |
| Michaela Strnadová | Women's K-1 500 m | 1:55.806 | 5 q | 1:56.154 | 7 | Did not advance | |

Qualification Legend: Q = Qualify to final; q = Qualify to semifinal

== Cycling ==
=== Road ===
Men

| Athlete | Event | Time | Rank |
|---|---|---|---|
| René Andrle | Road race | 5:50:35 | 58 |
| René Andrle | Time trial | 1:00:27.29 | 16 |
| Michal Hrazdíra | Road race | DNF | |
| Michal Hrazdíra | Time trial | 1:00:07.23 | 13 |
| Ondřej Sosenka | Road race | 5:50:35 | 65 |
| Ján Svorada | Road race | 5:50:35 | 63 |

Women

| Athlete | Event | Time | Rank |
|---|---|---|---|
| Lada Kozlíková | Road race | DNF | |
| Lada Kozlíková | Time trial | 32:15.41 | 5 |
| Martina Růžičková | Road race | 3:40:43 | 52 |

=== Track ===
Sprint

| Athlete | Event | Qualification | | Round 1 | Repechage 1 | Round 2 | Repechage 2 | Quarterfinals | Semifinals | Final | |
| Athlete | Event | Time Speed (km/h) | Rank | Opposition Time Speed (km/h) | Opposition Time Speed (km/h) | Opposition Time Speed (km/h) | Opposition Time Speed (km/h) | Opposition Time Speed (km/h) | Opposition Time Speed (km/h) | Opposition Time Speed (km/h) | Rank |
|---|---|---|---|---|---|---|---|---|---|---|---|
| Alois Kaňkovský | Men's sprint | 10.956; 65.717 | 18 | Bos (NED); L | Mulder (NED); Kim C-B (KOR); L | Did not advance | | | | | |

Pursuit

| Athlete | Event | Qualification | | Semifinals | | Final | |
| Athlete | Event | Time | Rank | Opponent Results | Rank | Opponent Results | Rank |
|---|---|---|---|---|---|---|---|
| Lenka Valová | Women's individual pursuit | 3:54.372 | 11 | Did not advance | | | |

Time trial

| Athlete | Event | Time | Rank |
|---|---|---|---|
| Alois Kaňkovský | Men's time trial | 1:03.038 | 10 |

Keirin

| Athlete | Event | 1st round | Repechage | 2nd round | Final |
| Athlete | Event | Rank | Rank | Rank | Rank |
|---|---|---|---|---|---|
| Ivan Vrba | Men's keirin | 2 Q | Bye | 4 Q | 10 |

Omnium

| Athlete | Event | Points | Laps | Rank |
|---|---|---|---|---|
| Milan Kadlec | Men's points race | 65 | 3 | 5 |
| Lada Kozlíková | Women's points race | 0 | 0 | 15 |
| Milan Kadlec; Petr Lazar | Men's madison | 2 | 1 | 13 |

=== Mountain biking ===
| Athlete | Event | Time | Rank |
|---|---|---|---|
| Radim Kořínek | Men's cross-country | 2:25:28 | 22 |
| Jaroslav Kulhavý | Men's cross-country | DNF | |

== Equestrian ==
=== Eventing ===
| Athlete | Horse | Event | Dressage | | Cross-country | | | Jumping | | | | | | Total | |
| Athlete | Horse | Event | Dressage | | Cross-country | | | Qualifier | | | Final | | | Total | |
| Athlete | Horse | Event | Penalties | Rank | Penalties | Total | Rank | Penalties | Total | Rank | Penalties | Total | Rank | Penalties | Rank |
|---|---|---|---|---|---|---|---|---|---|---|---|---|---|---|---|
| Jaroslav Hatla | Jennallas Boy | Individual | 57.80 | =39 | 5.20 | 63.00 | =28 | 4.00 | 67.00 | =23 Q | 8.00 | 75.00 | =21 | 75.00 | =21 |

== Gymnastics ==
=== Artistic ===
Women

| Athlete | Event | Qualification | | | | | | Final | | | | | |
| Athlete | Event | Apparatus | | | | Total | Rank | Apparatus | | | | Total | Rank |
| Athlete | Event | V | UB | BB | F | Total | Rank | V | UB | BB | F | Total | Rank |
|---|---|---|---|---|---|---|---|---|---|---|---|---|---|
| Jana Komrsková | All-around | 9.225 | 9.275 | 8.700 | 9.012 | 36.212 | 32 | Did not advance | | | | | |

=== Rhythmic ===
| Athlete | Event | Qualification | | | | | | Final | | | | | |
| Athlete | Event | Hoop | Ball | Clubs | Ribbon | Total | Rank | Hoop | Ball | Clubs | Ribbon | Total | Rank |
|---|---|---|---|---|---|---|---|---|---|---|---|---|---|
| Dominika Červenková | Individual | 22.350 | 22.900 | 18.300 | 21.200 | 84.750 | 20 | Did not advance | | | | | |

== Judo ==
Czech Republic has qualified a single judoka.

| Athlete | Event | Round of 32 | Round of 16 | Quarterfinals | Semifinals | Repechage 1 | Repechage 2 | Repechage 3 | Final / BM | |
| Athlete | Event | Opposition Result | Opposition Result | Opposition Result | Opposition Result | Opposition Result | Opposition Result | Opposition Result | Opposition Result | Rank |
|---|---|---|---|---|---|---|---|---|---|---|
| Andrea Pažoutová | Women's −70 kg | Dadci (POL); W 1000–0000 | Arlove (AUS); L 0001–0010 | Did not advance | | Bye | Kim R-M (PRK); L 0011–0100 | Did not advance | | |

== Modern pentathlon ==
Three Czech athletes qualified to compete in the modern pentathlon event through the European and UIPM Championships.

| Athlete | Event | Shooting (10 m air pistol) | | | Fencing (épée one touch) | | | Swimming (200 m freestyle) | | | Riding (show jumping) | | | Running (3000 m) | | | Total points | Final rank |
| Athlete | Event | Points | Rank | MP Points | Results | Rank | MP points | Time | Rank | MP points | Penalties | Rank | MP points | Time | Rank | MP Points | Total points | Final rank |
|---|---|---|---|---|---|---|---|---|---|---|---|---|---|---|---|---|---|---|
| Libor Capalini | Men's | 179 | 13 | 1084 | 14–17 | =19 | 776 | 2:02.00 | 2 | 1336 | 84 | 8 | 1116 | 9:40.70 | 6 | 1080 | 5392 | 3rd place, bronze medalist(s) |
| Michal Michalík | Men's | 181 | 6 | 1108 | 18–13 | =6 | 888 | 2:08.51 | 15 | 1260 | 56 | 5 | 1144 | 10:17.68 | 28 | 932 | 5332 | 6 |
| Alexandra Kalinovská | Women's | 164 | 25 | 904 | 18–13 | 6 | 888 | 2:30.05 | 27 | 1120 | 252 | 29 | 948 | 11:14.40 | 15 | 1024 | 4884 | 26 |

== Rowing ==
Czech rowers qualified the following boats:

Men

| Athlete | Event | Heats | | Repechage | | Semifinals | | Final | |
| Athlete | Event | Time | Rank | Time | Rank | Time | Rank | Time | Rank |
|---|---|---|---|---|---|---|---|---|---|
| Václav Chalupa | Single sculls | 7:13.84 | 1 SA/B/C | Bye | | 6:59.39 | 1 FA | 6:59.13 | 5 |
| Petr Imre; Adam Michálek | Pair | 7:26.19 | 4 R | 6:33.24 | 4 | Did not advance | | | |
| Milan Doleček; Ondřej Synek | Double sculls | 6:50.67 | 2 SA/B | Bye | | 6:13.65 | 3 FA | 6:35.81 | 5 |
| Václav Maleček; Michal Vabroušek | Lightweight double sculls | 6:21.82 | 3 R | 6:19.04 | 1 SA/B | 6:23.17 | 5 FB | 6:46.77 | 9 |
| Jakub Makovička; Karel Neffe Jr. Jan Schindler; Petr Vitásek | Four | 6:31.23 | 3 SA/B | Bye | | 5:51.81 | 5 FB | 5:49.99 | 8 |
| Jakub Hanák; David Jirka; Tomáš Karas; David Kopřiva | Quadruple sculls | 5:40.83 | 1 SA/B | Bye | | 5:42.73 | 1 FA | 5:57.43 | 2nd place, silver medalist(s) |

Women

| Athlete | Event | Heats | | Repechage | | Semifinals | | Final | |
| Athlete | Event | Time | Rank | Time | Rank | Time | Rank | Time | Rank |
|---|---|---|---|---|---|---|---|---|---|
| Miroslava Knapková | Single sculls | 7:25.23 | 1 SA/B | Bye | | 7:36.73 | 2 FA | 7:25.14 | 4 |

Qualification Legend: FA=Final A (medal); FB=Final B (non-medal); FC=Final C (non-medal); FD=Final D (non-medal); FE=Final E (non-medal); FF=Final F (non-medal); SA/B=Semifinals A/B; SC/D=Semifinals C/D; SE/F=Semifinals E/F; R=Repechage

== Sailing ==
Czech sailors have qualified one boat for each of the following events.

Men

| Athlete | Event | Race | | | | | | | | | | | Net points | Final rank |
| Athlete | Event | 1 | 2 | 3 | 4 | 5 | 6 | 7 | 8 | 9 | 10 | M* | Net points | Final rank |
|---|---|---|---|---|---|---|---|---|---|---|---|---|---|---|
| Tom Malina | Mistral | 28 | 25 | 32 | 32 | 31 | 26 | ~~33~~ | 28 | 29 | 32 | 22 | 285 | 31 |
| Michal Maier | Finn | 13 | 17 | 19 | 9 | ~~20~~ | 12 | 15 | 18 | 4 | 7 | 6 | 120 | 15 |

Women

| Athlete | Event | Race | | | | | | | | | | | Net points | Final rank |
| Athlete | Event | 1 | 2 | 3 | 4 | 5 | 6 | 7 | 8 | 9 | 10 | M* | Net points | Final rank |
|---|---|---|---|---|---|---|---|---|---|---|---|---|---|---|
| Lenka Šmídová | Europe | 10 | 13 | 1 | 13 | 1 | ~~DSQ~~ | 1 | 6 | 3 | 7 | 10 | 65 | 2nd place, silver medalist(s) |

Open

| Athlete | Event | Race | | | | | | | | | | | Net points | Final rank |
| Athlete | Event | 1 | 2 | 3 | 4 | 5 | 6 | 7 | 8 | 9 | 10 | M* | Net points | Final rank |
|---|---|---|---|---|---|---|---|---|---|---|---|---|---|---|
| Martin Trčka | Laser | ~~37~~ | 29 | 15 | 27 | 15 | 32 | 28 | 31 | 33 | 10 | 11 | 231 | 25 |

M = Medal race; OCS = On course side of the starting line; DSQ = Disqualified; DNF = Did not finish; DNS= Did not start; RDG = Redress given

== Shooting ==
Seven Czech shooters (five men and two women) qualified to compete in the following events:

Men

| Athlete | Event | Qualification | | Final | |
| Athlete | Event | Points | Rank | Points | Rank |
|---|---|---|---|---|---|
| Václav Bečvář | 50 m rifle prone | 592 | =16 | Did not advance | |
| Václav Bečvář | 50 m rifle 3 positions | 1148 | =31 | Did not advance | |
| Tomáš Caknakis | 10 m running target | 560 | 17 | Did not advance | |
| Miroslav Januš | 10 m running target | 564 | 15 | Did not advance | |
| Tomáš Jeřábek | 50 m rifle prone | 591 | =24 | Did not advance | |
| Tomáš Jeřábek | 50 m rifle 3 positions | 1155 | =24 | Did not advance | |
| Jan Sychra | Skeet | 121 | =9 | Did not advance | |
| Martin Tenk | 10 m air pistol | 577 | =20 | Did not advance | |
| Martin Tenk | 50 m pistol | 559 | 9 | Did not advance | |

Women

| Athlete | Event | Qualification | | Final | |
| Athlete | Event | Points | Rank | Points | Rank |
|---|---|---|---|---|---|
| Lenka Hyková | 10 m air pistol | 380 | =16 | Did not advance | |
| Lenka Hyková | 25 m pistol | 588 | 2 Q | 687.8 | 2nd place, silver medalist(s) |
| Kateřina Kůrková | 10 m air rifle | 398 | 3 Q | 501.1 | 3rd place, bronze medalist(s) |
| Kateřina Kůrková | 50 m rifle 3 positions | 565 | 27 | Did not advance | |

== Swimming ==
Czech swimmers earned qualifying standards in the following events (up to a maximum of 2 swimmers in each event at the A-standard time, and 1 at the B-standard time):

Men

| Athlete | Event | Heat | | Semifinal | | Final | |
| Athlete | Event | Time | Rank | Time | Rank | Time | Rank |
|---|---|---|---|---|---|---|---|
| Květoslav Svoboda | 200 m freestyle | 1:49.25 | 9 Q | 1:49.27 | 9 | Did not advance | |
| Daniel Málek | 100 m breaststroke | 1:03.35 | 28 | Did not advance | | | |
| Daniel Málek | 200 m breaststroke | 2:17.47 | 30 | Did not advance | | | |
| Michal Rubáček | 100 m butterfly | 54.87 | 39 | Did not advance | | | |
| Josef Horký; Michal Rubáček; Martin Škacha; Květoslav Svoboda | 4 × 200 m freestyle relay | 7:26.26 | 13 | —N/a | | Did not advance | |

Women

| Athlete | Event | Heat | | Semifinal | | Final | |
| Athlete | Event | Time | Rank | Time | Rank | Time | Rank |
|---|---|---|---|---|---|---|---|
| Sandra Kazíková | 50 m freestyle | 26.18 | 25 | Did not advance | | | |
| Jana Myšková | 100 m freestyle | 56.59 | 23 | Did not advance | | | |
| Jana Myšková | 200 m freestyle | 2:04.62 | 33 | Did not advance | | | |
| Kristýna Kyněrová | 400 m freestyle | 4:21.12 | 30 | —N/a | | Did not advance | |
| Jana Pechanová | 800 m freestyle | 8:47.38 | 19 | —N/a | | Did not advance | |
| Ilona Hlaváčková | 100 m backstroke | 1:01.95 | 9 Q | 1:01.81 | 12 | Did not advance | |
| Kateřina Pivoňková | 200 m backstroke | 2:16.08 | 19 | Did not advance | | | |
| Ilona Hlaváčková; Sandra Kazíková; Petra Klosová; Jana Myšková | 4 × 100 m freestyle relay | 3:46.83 | 13 | —N/a | | Did not advance | |

== Synchronized swimming ==
Two Czech synchronized swimmers qualified a spot in the women's duet.

| Athlete | Event | Technical routine | | Free routine (preliminary) | | | Free routine (final) | | |
| Athlete | Event | Points | Rank | Points | Total (technical + free) | Rank | Points | Total (technical + free) | Rank |
|---|---|---|---|---|---|---|---|---|---|
| Soňa Bernardová; Ivana Bursová | Duet | 43.750 | 15 | 44.334 | 88.084 | =14 | Did not advance | | |

== Table tennis ==
Four Czech table tennis players qualified for the following events.

| Athlete | Event | Round 1 | Round 2 | Round 3 | Round 4 | Quarterfinals | Semifinals | Final / BM | |
| Athlete | Event | Opposition Result | Opposition Result | Opposition Result | Opposition Result | Opposition Result | Opposition Result | Opposition Result | Rank |
|---|---|---|---|---|---|---|---|---|---|
| Petr Korbel | Men's singles | Bye | | Ko L C (HKG); L 3–4 | Did not advance | | | | |
| Petr Korbel; Richard Výborný | Men's doubles | —N/a | Babungu / Luyindula (COD); W 4–0 | Mazunov / Smirnov (RUS); L 1–4 | Did not advance | | | | |
| Renáta Štrbiková | Women's singles | Fazlić (USA); L 2–4 | Did not advance | | | | | | |
| Renáta Štrbiková; Alena Vachovcová | Women's doubles | Bye | | Nonaka / Silva (BRA); W 4–2 | Boroš / Vaida (CRO); L 1–4 | Did not advance | | | |

== Tennis ==
Czech Republic nominated four male and four female tennis players to compete in the tournament.

Men

| Athlete | Event | Round of 64 | Round of 32 | Round of 16 | Quarterfinals | Semifinals | Final / BM | |
| Athlete | Event | Opposition Score | Opposition Score | Opposition Score | Opposition Score | Opposition Score | Opposition Score | Rank |
|---|---|---|---|---|---|---|---|---|
| Tomáš Berdych | Singles | Mayer (GER); W 6–3, 7–5 | Federer (SUI); W 4–6, 7–5, 7–5 | Robredo (ESP); W 7–6^{(7–2)}, 4–6, 8–6 | Dent (USA); L 4–6, 1–6 | Did not advance | | |
| Jiří Novák | Singles | Henman (GBR); W 6–3, 6–3 | Youzhny (RUS); L 4–6, 3–6 | Did not advance | | | | |
| Tomáš Berdych; Jiří Novák | Doubles | —N/a | Arthurs / Woodbridge (AUS); L 4–6, 3–6 | Did not advance | | | | |
| Martin Damm; Cyril Suk | Doubles | —N/a | Economidis / Mazarakis (GRE); W 6–1, 6–3 | Ančić / Ljubičić (CRO); L 6–7^{(6–8)}, 7–6^{(7–2)}, 5–7 | Did not advance | | | |

Women

| Athlete | Event | Round of 64 | Round of 32 | Round of 16 | Quarterfinals | Semifinals | Final / BM | |
| Athlete | Event | Opposition Score | Opposition Score | Opposition Score | Opposition Score | Opposition Score | Opposition Score | Rank |
|---|---|---|---|---|---|---|---|---|
| Iveta Benešová | Singles | Morigami (JPN); L 1–6, 4–6 | Did not advance | | | | | |
| Klára Koukalová | Singles | Maleeva (BUL); L 1–6, 4–6 | Did not advance | | | | | |
| Barbora Strýcová | Singles | Henin-Hardenne (BEL); L 3–6, 4–6 | Did not advance | | | | | |
| Libuše Průšová; Barbora Strýcová | Doubles | —N/a | Kuznetsova / Likhovtseva (RUS); L 2–6, 6–3, 1–6 | Did not advance | | | | |

== Triathlon ==
Two Czech triathletes in 2004 were veterans, but the nation's defending bronze medallist did not return. The Czechs' best result in 2004 was a twenty-sixth-place finish.

| Athlete | Event | Swim (1.5 km) | Trans 1 | Bike (40 km) | Trans 2 | Run (10 km) | Total Time | Rank |
|---|---|---|---|---|---|---|---|---|
| Martin Krňávek | Men's | 18:19 | 0:21 | 1:05:37 | 0:21 | 38:58 | 2:02:54.59 | 42 |
| Filip Ospalý | Men's | 18:23 | 0:19 | 1:05:32 | 0:20 | 33:22 | 1:57:17.58 | 29 |
| Renata Berková | Women's | 19:48 | 0:20 | 1:13:14 | 0:27 | 38:48 | 2:11:50.94 | 32 |
| Lenka Radová | Women's | 19:41 | 0:22 | 1:10:49 | 0:23 | 39:24 | 2:09:54.47 | 26 |
| Lucie Zelenková | Women's | 19:23 | | DNF | | | | |

== Volleyball ==
=== Beach ===
| Athlete | Event | Preliminary round | | | Standing | Round of 16 | Quarterfinals | Semifinals | Final | |
| Athlete | Event | Opposition Score | Opposition Score | Opposition Score | Standing | Opposition Score | Opposition Score | Opposition Score | Opposition Score | Rank |
|---|---|---|---|---|---|---|---|---|---|---|
| Eva Celbová; Soňa Nováková | Women's | Kadijk / Leenstra (NED); W 2–0 (21–19, 21–16) | Kusuhara / Tokuno (JPN); W 2–0 (23–21, 21–12) | May / Walsh (USA); L 0–2 (17–21, 17–21) | 2 Q | McPeak / Youngs (USA); L 0–2 (16–21, 16–21) | Did not advance | | | |

== Weightlifting ==
Czech Republic has qualified a single weightlifter.

| Athlete | Event | Snatch | | Clean & Jerk | | Total | Rank |
| Athlete | Event | Result | Rank | Result | Rank | Total | Rank |
|---|---|---|---|---|---|---|---|
| Tomáš Matykiewicz | Men's −105 kg | 177.5 | =13 | 215 | =9 | 392.5 | 12 |

== Wrestling ==
Key:

- VT - Victory by Fall.
- PP - Decision by Points - the loser with technical points.
- PO - Decision by Points - the loser without technical points.

Men's Greco-Roman

| Athlete | Event | Elimination Pool | | | Quarterfinal | Semifinal | Final / BM | |
| Athlete | Event | Opposition Result | Opposition Result | Rank | Opposition Result | Opposition Result | Opposition Result | Rank |
|---|---|---|---|---|---|---|---|---|
| Petr Švehla | −55 kg | Hall (USA); L 1–3 ^{PP} | Vakulenko (UKR); L 0–3 ^{PO} | 3 | Did not advance | | | 19 |
| David Vála | −120 kg | Baroyev (RUS); L 0–3 ^{PO} | Chekhauskoi (BLR); W 3–0 ^{PO} | 2 | Did not advance | | | 14 |

== See also ==
- Czech Republic at the 2004 Summer Paralympics
