= Basketball at the 2004 Summer Olympics =

16th Olympic Basketball Tournament
- Athens 2004

Tournament details
- Olympics: 2004 Summer Olympics
- Host nation: Greece
- City: Athens
- Duration: 15–28 August 2004

Men's tournament
- Teams: 12
Medals
Gold medalists	Argentina
Silver medalists	Italy
Bronze medalists	United States

Women's tournament
- Teams: 12
Medals
Gold medalists	United States
Silver medalists	Australia
Bronze medalists	Russia

Tournaments
← Sydney 2000	Beijing 2008 →

Basketball at the 2004 Summer Olympics was the sixteenth appearance of the sport of basketball as an official Olympic medal event. It took place at the Helliniko Olympic Indoor Arena, a part of the Hellinikon Olympic Complex, in Athens, for the preliminary rounds, with the later stages being held in the Olympic Indoor Hall at the Athens Olympic Sports Complex.

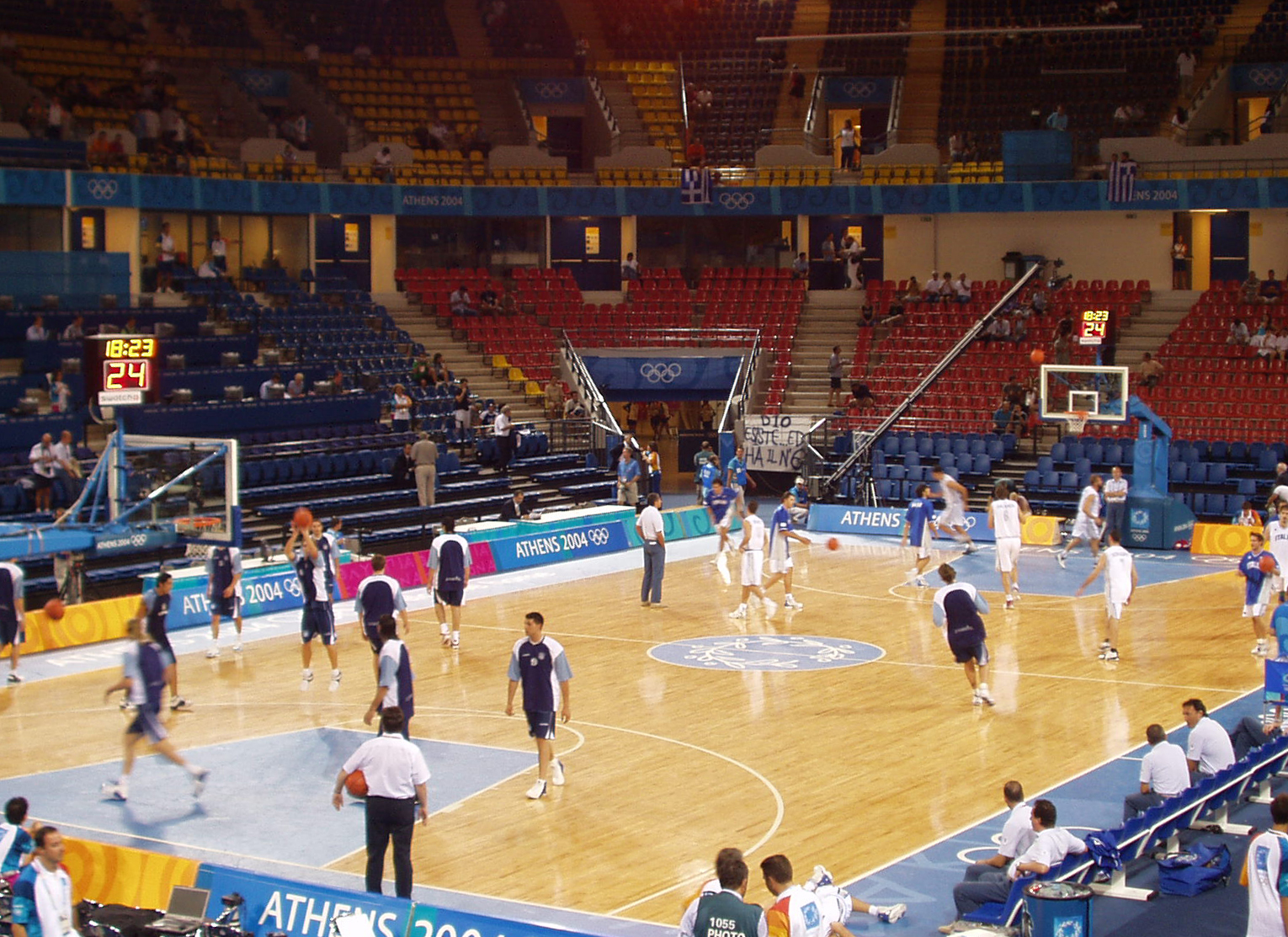
Italy and Argentina warming up before the game.

Argentina, led by NBA standouts like Manu Ginóbili and Luis Scola, won the country's first and only gold medal in the event.

In Olympic basketball tournaments, 12 teams take part. The host nation (Greece in 2004) automatically receives a berth in the tournament. By winning the two World Championship tournaments in 2002, FR Yugoslavia, now named Serbia and Montenegro, also put a team into the men's tournament and the United States a team in the women's tournament.

The remaining 10 spots in each tournament were allocated by the five Olympic zones. Each of these zones held its own tournaments to select its entries in the Olympic tournament. Africa was allocated one spot in each of these, Oceania was allocated two apiece, and Europe was allocated three. Furthermore, the Americas were allocated three teams for the men's tournament and just one in the women's tournament, whereas Asia was allocated just one in the men's tournament and three in the women's tournament.

== Medalists ==
Event	Gold	Silver	Bronze
Men	Argentina Carlos Delfino; Gabriel Fernández; Manu Ginóbili; Leonardo Gutiérrez; Walter Herrmann; Alejandro Montecchia; Andrés Nocioni; Fabricio Oberto; Juan Ignacio Sánchez; Luis Scola; Hugo Sconochini; Rubén Wolkowyski	Italy Roberto Chiacig; Luca Garri; Denis Marconato; Giacomo Galanda; Nikola Radulović; Alex Righetti; Matteo Soragna; Gianluca Basile; Massimo Bulleri; Gianmarco Pozzecco; Michele Mian; Rodolfo Rombaldoni	United States Allen Iverson; Stephon Marbury; Dwyane Wade; Carlos Boozer; Carmelo Anthony; LeBron James; Emeka Okafor; Shawn Marion; Amar'e Stoudemire; Tim Duncan; Lamar Odom; Richard Jefferson
Women	United States Shannon Johnson; Dawn Staley; Sue Bird; Sheryl Swoopes; Ruth Riley; Lisa Leslie; Tamika Catchings; Tina Thompson; Diana Taurasi; Yolanda Griffith; Katie Smith; Swin Cash	Australia Alicia Poto; Allison Tranquilli; Sandy Brondello; Penny Taylor; Suzy Batkovic; Trisha Fallon; Kristi Harrower; Laura Summerton; Belinda Snell; Natalie Porter; Rachael Sporn; Lauren Jackson	Russia Olga Arteshina; Oxana Rakhmatulina; Natalia Vodopyanova; Diana Goustilina; Yelena Baranova; Tatiana Shchegoleva; Ilona Korstin; Maria Stepanova; Maria Kalmykova; Elena Karpova; Irina Osipova; Anna Arkhipova

== Qualification ==
A National Olympic Committee (NOC) may enter just one men's team with 12 players, and just one women's team with 12 players in the regional tournaments. The reigning world champions and the host country qualify automatically, as do the winners of the five continental championships, plus the runner-up and third place teams from the Americas and Europe competitions, and the runner-up Oceania in the men's tournament. For the women's tournament, the extra teams consisted of the runner-up and third place teams from Asia and Europe, and the runner-up from Oceania.

=== Basketball – Men ===
Africa	Americas	Asia	Europe	Oceania	Automatic qualifiers
Angola	United States; Argentina; Puerto Rico	China	Lithuania; Spain; Italy	Australia; New Zealand	Serbia and Montenegro – World champions Greece – Olympic hosts

=== Basketball – Women ===
Africa	Americas	Asia	Europe	Oceania	Automatic qualifiers
Nigeria	Brazil	China; Japan; South Korea	Russia; Czech Republic; Spain	Australia; New Zealand	United States – World champions Greece – Olympic hosts

== Format ==
- Twelve teams are split into two preliminary round groups of six teams each.
- The top four teams from both groups qualify for the knockout stage.
- Fifth-placed teams from both groups compete for 9th place in an additional match.
- Sixth-placed teams from both groups compete for 11th place in an additional match.
- In the quarterfinals, the matchups are as follows: A1 vs. B4, A2 vs. B3, A3 vs. B2 and A4 vs. B1.
  - From the eliminated teams at the quarterfinals, the loser from A1 vs. B4 competes against the loser from B1 vs. A4 for 7th place in an additional match. The remaining two loser teams compete for 5th place in an additional match.
- The winning teams from the quarterfinals meet in the semifinals as follows: A1/B4 vs. A3/B2 and A2/B3 vs. A4/B1.
- The winning teams from the semifinals contest the gold medal. The losing teams contest the bronze.

Tie-breaking criteria:

1. Head to head results
2. Goal average (not the goal difference) between the tied teams
3. Goal average of the tied teams for all teams in its group

== Teams ==
=== Men ===
The men's event involved twelve teams split equally into two groups.

Group A:

- Argentina
- China
- Italy
- New Zealand
- Serbia and Montenegro
- Spain

Group B:

- Angola
- Australia
- Greece
- Lithuania
- Puerto Rico
- United States

=== Women ===
The women's event involved 12 teams split in two groups.

Group A:

- Australia
- Brazil
- Greece
- Japan
- Nigeria
- Russia

Group B:

- China
- Czech Republic
- New Zealand
- South Korea
- Spain
- United States

== Men's tournament ==
=== Preliminary round ===
The four best teams from each group advanced to the quarterfinal round.

==== Group A ====
Pos	Team	Pld	W	L	PF	PA	PD	Pts	Qualification
1	Spain	5	5	0	405	349	+56	10	Quarterfinals
2	Italy	5	3	2	371	341	+30	8 (Note: Head-to-head record: Italy 1–0 Argentina)	Quarterfinals
3	Argentina	5	3	2	414	396	+18	8	Quarterfinals
4	China	5	2	3	303	382	−79	7	Quarterfinals
5	New Zealand	5	1	4	399	413	−14	6 (Note: Head-to-head record: New Zealand 1–0 Serbia and Montenegro)	9th place playoff
6	Serbia and Montenegro	5	1	4	377	388	−11	6	11th place playoff

Source: FIBA archive
Rules for classification: 1) points; 2) head-to-head points; 3) head-to-head goal average; 4) head-to-head number of points scored.
Notes:

August 15
11:15

Italy	71–69	New Zealand

Helliniko Indoor Arena, Athens

August 15
14:30

China	58–83	Spain

Helliniko Indoor Arena, Athens

August 15
16:45

Argentina	83–82	Serbia and Montenegro

Helliniko Indoor Arena

August 17
9:00

New Zealand	62–69	China

Helliniko Indoor Arena, Athens

August 17
16:45

Serbia and Montenegro	74–72	Italy

Helliniko Indoor Arena, Athens

August 17
20:00

Spain	87–76	Argentina

Helliniko Indoor Arena, Athens

August 19
9:00

Serbia and Montenegro	87–90	New Zealand

Helliniko Indoor Arena, Athens

August 19
11:15

Italy	63–71	Spain

Helliniko Indoor Arena

August 19
20:00

Argentina	82–57	China

Helliniko Indoor Arena, Athens

August 21
11:15

Spain	76–68	Serbia and Montenegro

Helliniko Indoor Arena, Athens

August 21
14:30

New Zealand	94–98	Argentina

Helliniko Indoor Arena, Athens

August 21
16:45

China	52–89	Italy

Helliniko Indoor Arena, Athens

August 23
9:00

Spain	88–84	New Zealand

Helliniko Indoor Arena, Athens

August 23
16:45

Serbia and Montenegro	66–67	China

Helliniko Indoor Arena, Athens

August 23
20:00

Italy	76–75	Argentina

Helliniko Indoor Arena, Athens

==== Group B ====
Pos	Team	Pld	W	L	PF	PA	PD	Pts	Qualification
1	Lithuania	5	5	0	468	414	+54	10	Quarterfinals
2	Greece	5	3	2	389	343	+46	8 (Note: Head-to-head record: Greece 1–1 (1.10 GAvg), Puerto Rico 1–1 (0.99), United States 1–1 (0.92))	Quarterfinals
3	Puerto Rico	5	3	2	410	411	−1	8	Quarterfinals
4	United States	5	3	2	418	389	+29	8	Quarterfinals
5	Australia	5	1	4	383	411	−28	6	9th place playoff
6	Angola	5	0	5	321	421	−100	5	11th place playoff

Source: FIBA archive
Rules for classification: 1) points; 2) head-to-head points; 3) head-to-head goal average; 4) head-to-head number of points scored.
Notes:

August 15
9:00

Angola	73–78	Lithuania

Helliniko Indoor Arena, Athens

August 15
20:00

Puerto Rico	92–73	United States

Helliniko Indoor Arena, Athens

August 15
22:15

Greece	76–54	Australia

Helliniko Indoor Arena, Athens

August 17
11:15

Australia	83–59	Angola

Helliniko Indoor Arena, Athens

August 17
14:30

Lithuania	98–90	Puerto Rico

Helliniko Indoor Arena, Athens

August 17
22:15

United States	77–71	Greece

Helliniko Indoor Arena, Athens

August 19
14:30

United States	89–79	Australia

Helliniko Indoor Arena, Athens

August 19
16:45

Puerto Rico	83–80	Angola

Helliniko Indoor Arena, Athens

August 19
22:15

Greece	76–98	Lithuania

Helliniko Indoor Arena, Athens

August 21
9:00

Australia	82–87	Puerto Rico

Helliniko Indoor Arena, Athens

August 21
20:00

Lithuania	94–90	United States

Helliniko Indoor Arena, Athens

August 21
22:15

Angola	56–88	Greece

Helliniko Indoor Arena, Athens

August 23
11:15

Lithuania	100–85	Australia

Helliniko Indoor Arena, Athens

August 23
14:30

United States	89–53	Angola

Helliniko Indoor Arena, Athens

August 23
22:15

Greece	78–58	Puerto Rico

Helliniko Indoor Arena, Athens

=== Knockout stage ===
Quarterfinals (August 26)
A1	Spain	94
B4	United States	102
A3	Argentina	69
B2	Greece	64
B1	Lithuania	95
A4	China	75
A2	Italy	83
B3	Puerto Rico	70

Semifinals (August 27)
B4	United States	81
A3	Argentina	89
B1	Lithuania	91
A2	Italy	100

Gold-medal game (August 28)
A3	Argentina	84
A2	Italy	69
Bronze-medal game (August 28)
B4	United States	104
B1	Lithuania	96

=== Classification round ===
August 24
14:30

11th place

Serbia and Montenegro	85–62	Angola

Helliniko Indoor Arena, Athens

August 24
16:45

9th place

New Zealand	80–98	Australia

Helliniko Indoor Arena, Athens

August 28
9:00

7th place

China	76–92	Spain

Olympic Indoor Hall, Athens

August 28
11:15

5th place

Puerto Rico	75–85	Greece

Olympic Indoor Hall, Athens

== Women's tournament ==
=== Preliminary round ===
The four best teams from each group advanced to the quarterfinal round.

==== Group A ====
Pos	Team	Pld	W	L	PF	PA	PD	Pts	Qualification
1	Australia	5	5	0	418	313	+105	10	Quarterfinals
2	Russia	5	4	1	389	333	+56	9	Quarterfinals
3	Brazil	5	3	2	430	361	+69	8	Quarterfinals
4	Greece (H)	5	2	3	353	392	−39	7	Quarterfinals
5	Japan	5	1	4	381	485	−104	6	
6	Nigeria	5	0	5	335	422	−87	5	

Source: FIBA archive
Rules for classification: 1) points; 2) head-to-head points; 3) head-to-head goal average; 4) head-to-head number of points scored.
(H) Hosts

August 14
9:00

Australia	85–73	Nigeria

Helliniko Indoor Arena, Athens

August 14
16:45

Japan	62–128	Brazil

Helliniko Indoor Arena, Athens

August 14
20:00

Greece	62–69	Russia

Olympic Indoor Hall, Athens

August 16
11:15

Nigeria	73–79	Japan

Olympic Indoor Hall, Athens

August 16
20:00

Brazil	87–75	Greece

Helliniko Indoor Arena, Athens

August 16
22:15

Russia	56–75	Australia

Olympic Indoor Hall, Athens

August 18
11:15

Japan	78–97	Australia

Helliniko Indoor Arena, Athens

August 18
16:45

Greece	83–68	Nigeria

Helliniko Indoor Arena, Athens

August 18
20:00

Brazil	67–77	Russia

Olympic Indoor Hall, Athens

August 20
9:00

Russia	94–71	Japan

Olympic Indoor Hall, Athens

August 20
20:00

Australia	77–40	Greece

Helliniko Indoor Arena, Athens

August 20
22:15

Nigeria	63–82	Brazil

Helliniko Indoor Arena, Athens

August 22
11:15

Nigeria	58–93	Russia

Helliniko Indoor Arena, Athens

August 22
14:30

Brazil	66–84	Australia

Helliniko Indoor Arena, Athens

August 22
16:45

Greece	93–91	Japan

Helliniko Indoor Arena, Athens

==== Group B ====
Pos	Team	Pld	W	L	PF	PA	PD	Pts	Qualification
1	United States	5	5	0	430	285	+145	10	Quarterfinals
2	Spain	5	4	1	368	334	+34	9	Quarterfinals
3	Czech Republic	5	3	2	408	375	+33	8	Quarterfinals
4	New Zealand	5	2	3	321	414	−93	7	Quarterfinals
5	China	5	1	4	360	406	−46	6	
6	South Korea	5	0	5	320	393	−73	5	

Source: FIBA archive
Rules for classification: 1) points; 2) head-to-head points; 3) head-to-head goal average; 4) head-to-head number of points scored.

August 14
11:15

South Korea	54–71	China

Helliniko Indoor Arena, Athens

August 14
14:30

United States	99–47	New Zealand

Helliniko Indoor Arena, Athens

August 14
22:15

Spain	80–78	Czech Republic

Helliniko Indoor Arena, Athens

August 16
9:00

New Zealand	81–73	South Korea

Helliniko Indoor Arena, Athens

August 16
14:30

Czech Republic	61–80	United States

Helliniko Indoor Arena, Athens

August 16
16:45

China	67–75	Spain

Helliniko Indoor Arena, Athens

August 18
9:00

China	83–98	Czech Republic

Helliniko Indoor Arena, Athens

August 18
14:30

South Korea	57–80	United States

Olympic Indoor Hall, Athens

August 18
22:15

Spain	91–57	New Zealand

Helliniko Indoor Arena, Athens

August 20
11:15

New Zealand	79–77	China

Helliniko Indoor Arena, Athens

August 20
14:30

United States	71–58	Spain

Helliniko Indoor Arena, Athens

August 20
16:45

Czech Republic	97–75	South Korea

Helliniko Indoor Arena, Athens

August 22
9:00

New Zealand	57–74	Czech Republic

Helliniko Indoor Arena, Athens

August 22
20:00

China	62–100	United States

Helliniko Indoor Arena, Athens

August 22
22:15

Spain	64–61	South Korea

Helliniko Indoor Arena, Athens

=== Knockout stage ===
Quarterfinals (August 25)
A1	Australia	94
B4	New Zealand	55
A3	Brazil	67
B2	Spain	64
B1	United States	102
A4	Greece	72
A2	Russia	70
B3	Czech Republic	49

Semifinals (August 27)
A1	Australia	88
A3	Brazil	75
B1	United States	66
A2	Russia	62

Gold-medal game (August 28)
A1	Australia	63
B1	United States	74
Bronze-medal game (August 28)
A3	Brazil	62
A2	Russia	71

=== Classification round ===
August 24
9:00

11th place

Nigeria	68–64	South Korea

Helliniko Indoor Arena, Athens

August 24
11:15

9th place

Japan	63–82	China

Helliniko Indoor Arena, Athens

August 27
9:00

7th place

Greece	87–83	New Zealand

Olympic Indoor Hall, Athens

August 27
11:15

5th place

Czech Republic	79–68	Spain

Olympic Indoor Hall, Athens

== Final standings ==
Rank	Men				Women			
Rank	Team	Pld	W	L	Team	Pld	W	L
1st place, gold medalist(s)	Argentina	8	6	2	United States	8	8	0
2nd place, silver medalist(s)	Italy	8	5	3	Australia	8	7	1
3rd place, bronze medalist(s)	United States	8	5	3	Russia	8	6	2
4th	Lithuania	8	6	2	Brazil	8	4	4
Eliminated at the quarterfinals
5th	Greece	7	4	3	Czech Republic	7	4	3
6th	Puerto Rico	7	3	4	Spain	7	4	3
7th	Spain	7	6	1	Greece	7	3	4
8th	China	7	2	5	New Zealand	7	2	5
Preliminary round 5th placers
9th	Australia	6	2	4	China	6	2	4
10th	New Zealand	6	1	5	Japan	6	1	5
Preliminary round 6th placers
11th	Serbia and Montenegro	6	2	4	Nigeria	6	1	5
12th	Angola	6	0	6	South Korea	6	0	6
