= Natalia Vodopyanova =

Russian basketball player

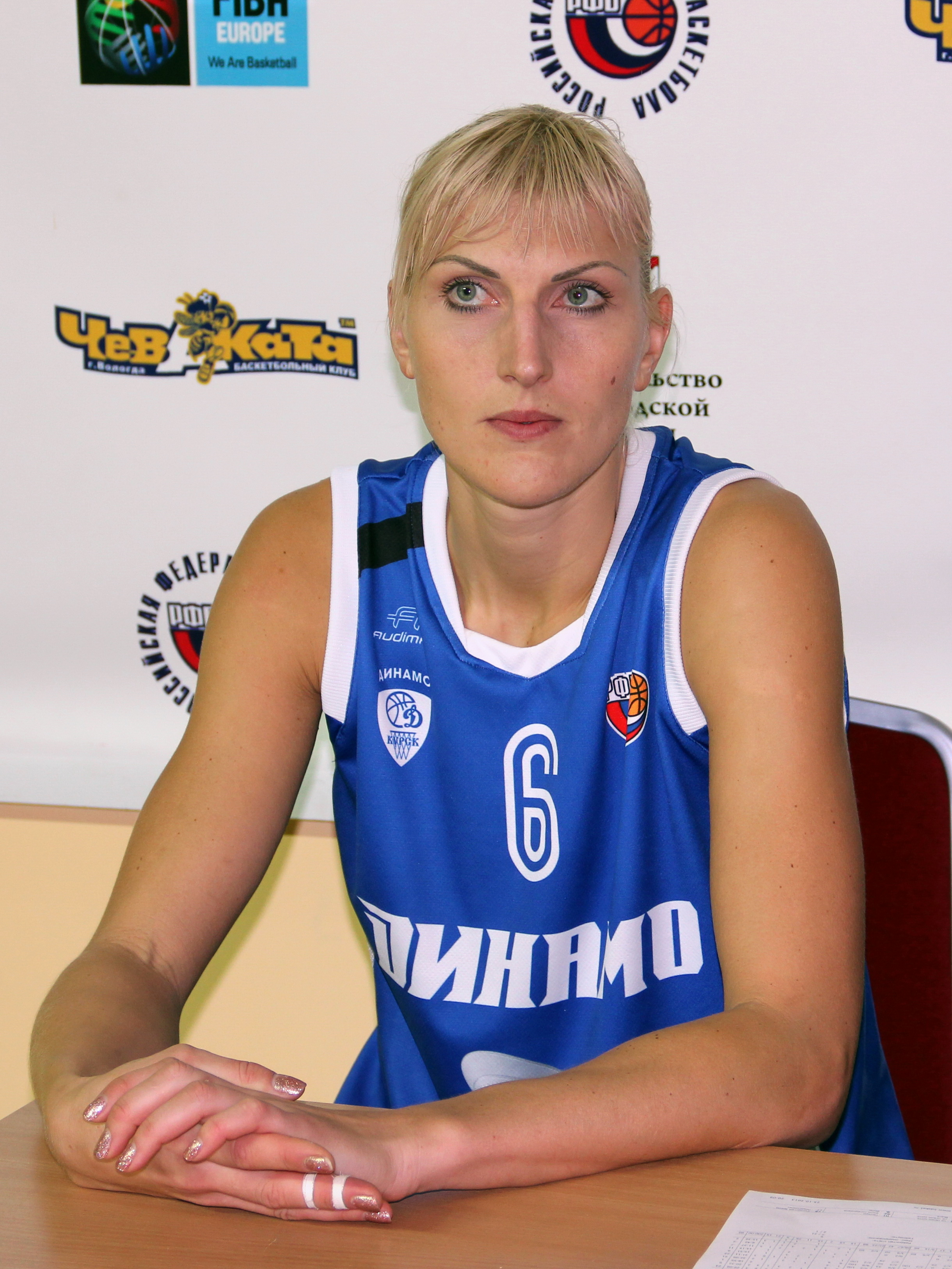
- Vodopyanova in 2013

Personal information
- Born: 4 June 1981 (age 45) Leningrad, Russian SFSR, Soviet Union
- Height: 188 cm (6 ft 2 in)
- Weight: 77 kg (170 lb)

Sport
- Sport: Basketball
- Team: Seattle Storm (2005)
Medal record
Representing Russia
Olympic Games
Bronze medal – third place	2004 Athens	Team
Bronze medal – third place	2008 Beijing	Team
World Championships
Silver medal – second place	2006 Brazil	Team
European Championships
Gold medal – first place	2007 Italy	Team

Natalia Andreyevna Vodopyanova (Russian: Наталья Андреевна Водопьянова, born 4 June 1981) is a Russian basketball player. She was part of the Russian teams that won bronze medals at the 2004 and 2008 Olympics and placed fourth in 2012; she also won the European title in 2007 and a silver medal at the 2006 World Championships.

== Career statistics ==
Legend
GP	Games played	GS	Games started	MPG	Minutes per game	RPG	Rebounds per game
APG	Assists per game	SPG	Steals per game	BPG	Blocks per game	PPG	Points per game
TO	Turnovers per game	FG%	Field-goal percentage	3P%	3-point field-goal percentage	FT%	Free-throw percentage
**Bold**	Career best	°	League leader

=== WNBA ===
==== Regular season ====
WNBA regular season statistics
Year	Team	GP	GS	MPG	FG%	3P%	FT%	RPG	APG	SPG	BPG	TO	PPG
2005	Seattle	17	0	5.8	.364	.200	.667	1.2	0.6	0.2	0.1	0.5	1.5
**Career**	1 year, 1 team	17	0	5.8	.364	.200	.667	1.2	0.6	0.2	0.1	0.5	1.5

==== Playoffs ====
WNBA playoff statistics
Year	Team	GP	GS	MPG	FG%	3P%	FT%	RPG	APG	SPG	BPG	TO	PPG
2005	Seattle	1	0	3.0	.000	—	—	0.0	0.0	0.0	0.0	0.0	0.0
**Career**	1 year, 1 team	1	0	3.0	.000	—	—	0.0	0.0	0.0	0.0	0.0	0.0
