= Oxana Rakhmatulina =

Russian-Kazakhstani basketball player

Medal record

Representing Russia

Women's basketball

Olympic Games
Bronze medal – third place	2004 Athens	Team competition
Bronze medal – third place	2008 Beijing	Team competition

Oxana Yevgeniyevna Rakhmatulina (Russian: Оксана Евгеньевна Рахматулина) (born December 7, 1976, in Alma-Ata, Kazakh SSR) is a Russian-Kazakhstani basketball guard, who competed for the Russian National Team at the 2004 Summer Olympics, winning the bronze medal.
