= Elena Karpova =

Russian basketball player (born 1980)

Medal record

Representing Russia

Women's basketball

Olympic Games
| Bronze medal – third place | 2004 Athens | Team competition |

Elena Viktorovna Karpova (Russian: Елена Викторовна Карпова; born 14 June 1980) is a Russian basketball player.

== Biography ==
Karpova was born on 14 June 1980, in Leningrad. She is 6 ft 2 in (1.88 m) and 161 pounds (73 kg). She is affiliated with the city of Montpellier.

Karpova was drafted into the Women's National Basketball Association by the Washington Mystics in 2001. She later played for several Russian teams and one in the Czech Republic before ending her basketball career in 2009.

Karpova competed as for the Russian National Team at the 2004 Summer Olympics, winning the bronze medal.
