= Maria Kalmykova =

Russian basketball player

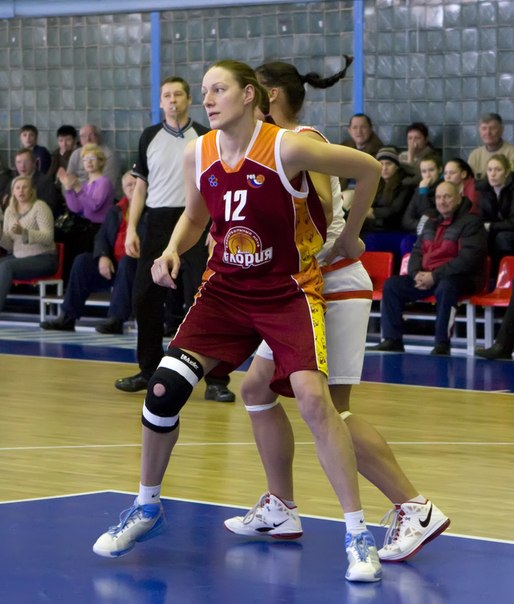

Medal record

Representing Russia

Women's basketball

Olympic Games
Bronze medal – third place	2004 Athens	Team competition

Maria Lvovna Kalmykova (Russian: Мария Львовна Калмыкова; born 14 January 1978 in Ryazan) is a Russian basketball player who competed for the Russian National Team at the 2004 Summer Olympics, winning the bronze medal. She is the only russian basketball player to make Quadruple-double in a professional game.
