= Diana Goustilina =

Russian basketball player

Medal record

Representing Russia

Women's basketball

Olympic Games
| Bronze medal – third place | 2004 Athens | Team competition |

Diana Vladimirovna Goustilina (Russian: Диа́на Влади́мировна Густи́лина, Diana Vladimirovna Gustilina; born 21 April 1974 in Vladivostok) is a Russian basketball player who competed for the Russian National Team at the 2004 Summer Olympics, winning the bronze medal.
