= Anastasia Kostaki =

Greek basketball player (born 1978)

Personal information
- Born: March 26, 1978 (age 48) Athens, Greece
- Listed height: 5 ft 7 in (1.70 m)
- Listed weight: 137 lb (62 kg)
- Position: Guard
- Number: 55

Career history
- 2006: Houston Comets
- Stats at WNBA.com
- Stats at Basketball Reference

Anastasia Kostaki (Greek: Αναστασία Κωστάκη; born March 26, 1978) is a Greek former professional basketball player.

== Biography ==
Kostaki started playing basketball at the age of nine and if she was not a basketball player she says she would have been a dancer or actress. She wants to work at the Greek Sports federation after retiring from basketball. She is the daughter of Konstantinos and Katerina and sister of Dimitra and Nikos. She became the first Greek player to play in the WNBA in 2006 when she played with the Houston Comets.

== Career pro club teams ==
- 1990-1997: (Greece) D.A.S. Ano Liosion
- 1997-1999: (Greece) A.C. Akademia 1975
- 1999-2002: (Greece) Asteras Exarchion
- 2002-2003: (France) Cavigal Nice Sports Basket
- 2003-2004: (Italy) Delta Alessandria
- 2004-2005: (Italy) ASD Basket Parma
- 2005-2006: (France) Pays d'Aix Basket 13
- 2006-2006: (United States) Houston Comets (WNBA) [Summer 2006]
- 2006-2006: (Russia) CSKA Samara
- 2006-2007: (Russia) Dynamo Moscow Region
- 2007-2007: (Slovakia) Dobrí anjeli Košice (only 2 games)
- 2008-2009: (Greece) Panathinaikos
- 2009–2013: (Slovakia) Dobrí anjeli Košice
- 2014-2015: (Greece) Panathinaikos
- 2015-2016: (Greece) Proteas Voulas

== Greece national team history ==
- 1996 FIBA Europe Under-18 Championship for Women (qualifying round, challenge round and final round)
- 1999 FIBA European Championship (qualifying round and challenge round)
- 2001 FIBA European Championship (semi-final round, qualifying round and final round)
- 2003 FIBA European Championship (final round)
- 2004 Athens Olympics

== Awards and accomplishments ==
- 2001-02 season: Third best scorer in the league (with 2 games missed), first in assists, first in fouls won (8 pg), first in free throws made and third in FT%, 6th in steals, etc.
- 2002-03: Named All-Star player and 1st team of preseason tournament.
