= Anna Arkhipova =

Russian basketball player (born 1973)

Medal record

Representing Russia

Women's basketball

Olympic Games
Bronze medal – third place	2004 Athens	Team competition

Anna Valeryevna Arkhipova (Russian: Анна Валерьевна Архипова) (born 27 July 1973 in Stavropol) is a Russian basketball player who competed for the Russian National Team at the 2004 Summer Olympics, winning the bronze medal.
