= Tatiana Shchegoleva =

Russian basketball player

Medal record

Representing Russia

Women's basketball

Olympic Games
Bronze medal – third place	2004 Athens	Team competition
Bronze medal – third place	2008 Beijing	Team competition

Tatiana Shchegoleva (born 9 February 1982) is a Russian basketball player who competed for the Russian National Team at the 2008 Summer Olympics, winning the bronze medal.
