= Hana Horáková =

Czech basketball player

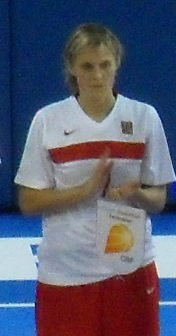

Personal information
- Born: 11 September 1979 (age 47) Bruntál, Czechoslovakia
- Listed height: 6 ft 0 in (1.83 m)
- Listed weight: 163 lb (74 kg)

Career information
- Playing career: 1996–2013
- Position: Guard

Career highlights
- FIBA Europe Women's Player of the Year (2010); FIBA World Championship MVP (2010)
- FIBA Hall of Fame
Medals
Women's basketball
Representing Czech Republic
FIBA World Championship for Women
Silver medal – second place	2010 Czech Rep	Team competition
European Championships
Gold medal – first place	2005 Turkey	Team competition
Silver medal – second place	2003 Greece	Team competition

Hana Horáková (née Machová, Czech pronunciation: [ˈɦana ˈɦoraːkovaː ˈmaxovaː]; born 11 September 1979 in Bruntál) is a former basketball player from the Czech Republic who played for BK Brno. She was a member of the national team that won the European title in 2005 by defeating Russia in the final.

== Career ==
Playing as a guard she also competed for her native country at the 2004 Summer Olympics in Athens, Greece, the 2008 Summer Olympics in Beijing and the 2012 Summer Olympics in London, finishing in fifth place in 2004 and in seventh place at the other two Olympics.

She won EuroLeague Women 2005-06 with Gambrinus Brno and played 12 ppg, 4.5 rpg and 3 apg averages in EuroLeague Women 2009–10. She also won the Turkish Women's Basketball League 2011 with Fenerbahçe Istanbul.

In 2010, she led the Czech Republic to a surprise 2nd-place finish in the FIBA World Championship for Women and was named the tournament MVP.
