= Gina Farmer =

New Zealand basketball player

Gina Farmer (born 12 December 1974) is a New Zealand former basketball player who competed in the 2000 Summer Olympics and in the 2004 Summer Olympics. Farmer also competed for New Zealand at the 1994 World Championship held in Australia.
