= Ye Li =

Chinese basketball player (born 1981)

- 叶莉
- Born: November 20, 1981 (age 44); Shanghai, China
- Occupation: Basketball player
- Height: 190 cm (6 ft 3 in)
- Spouse: Yao Ming (m. 2007)
- Children: 1

Ye Li (simplified Chinese: 叶莉; traditional Chinese: 葉莉; pinyin: Yè Lì; born November 20, 1981) is a Chinese professional basketball player who played for the Shanghai Octopus of the Women's Chinese Basketball Association and the China women's national basketball team at the 2004 Summer Olympics. She also won a gold medal as part of the Chinese women's basketball team at the 2003 Summer Universiade.

Born in Shanghai, Ye Li attended the University of Houston, where she met Chinese basketball player Yao Ming at the age of seventeen in 1998. They married on August 6, 2007. Ye gave birth to their daughter Yao Qinlei (whose English name is Amy) in Houston, Texas on May 21, 2010.
