= Maria Samoroukova =

Greek basketball player (born 1971)

Maria Samoroukova (born 19 December 1971 in Samara, Russia) is a Greek former basketball player who competed in the 2004 Summer Olympics.
