= Ilona Korstin =

Russian basketball player (born 1980)

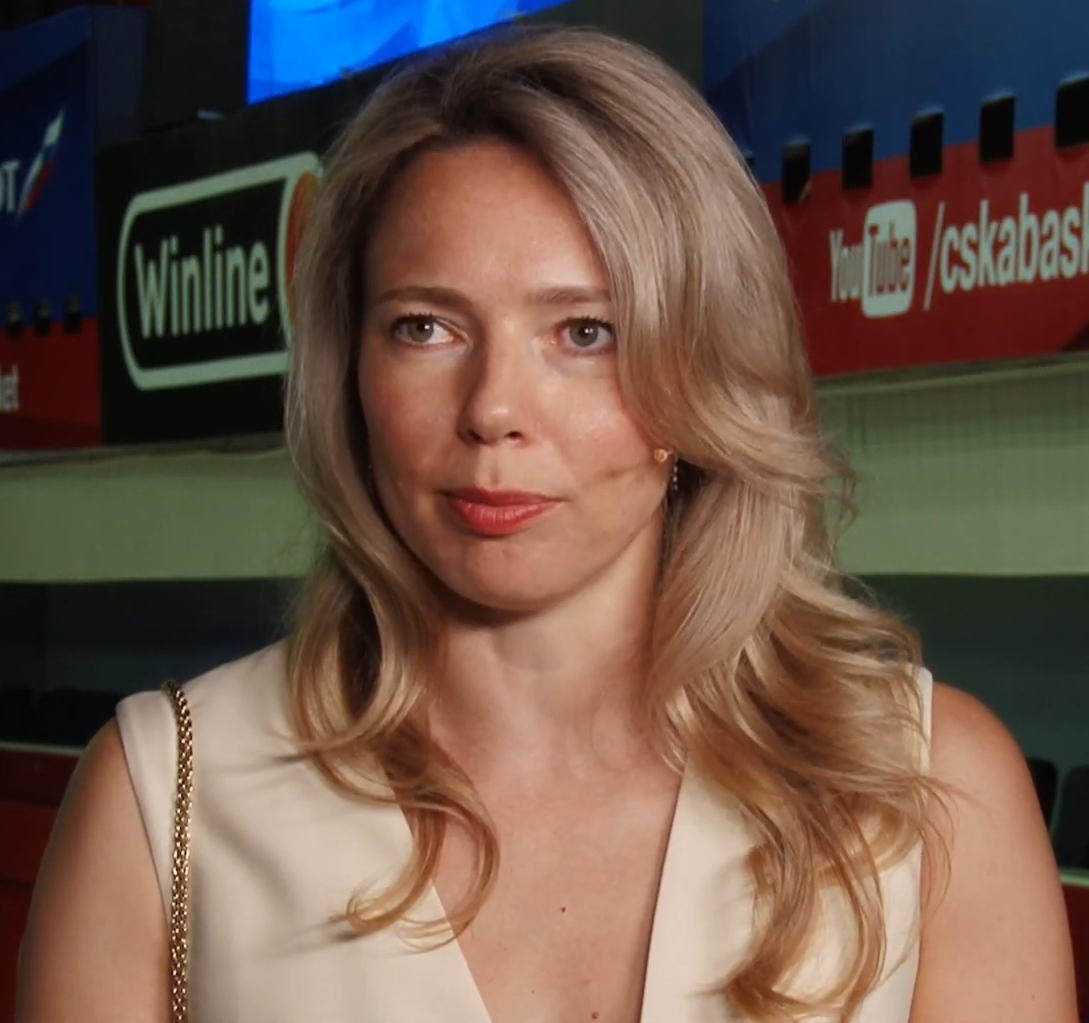
- Korstin in 2021

Personal information
- Born: 30 May 1980 (age 46) Leningrad, Russian SFSR, Soviet Union
- Listed height: 6 ft 0 in (1.83 m)
- Listed weight: 174 lb (79 kg)

Career information
- WNBA draft: 2001: 2nd round, 29th overall pick
- Drafted by: Phoenix Mercury
- Playing career: 1996–2013
- Position: Shooting guard

Career history
- 1997–2003: CJM Bourges Basket
- 2001: Phoenix Mercury
- 2003–2006: VBM-SGAU Samara
- 2006–2009: CSKA Moscow
- 2009–2011: Spartak M.R. Vidnoje
- 2011–2012: Beşiktaş
- 2012: Perfumerías Avenida
- 2012–2013: Dynamo Moscow

Career highlights
- Russian Player of the Year (2004)
- Stats at Basketball Reference
Medals
Representing Russia
Women's basketball
Olympic Games
Bronze medal – third place	2004 Athens	Team competition
Bronze medal – third place	2008 Beijing	Team competition
World Championship
Silver medal – second place	2002 China	Team competition
Silver medal – second place	2006 Brazil	Team competition
EuroBasket
Silver medal – second place	2001 France	Team competition
Gold medal – first place	2003 Greece	Team competition
Silver medal – second place	2005 Turkey	Team competition
Gold medal – first place	2007 Italy	Team competition
Silver medal – second place	2009 Latvia	Team competition
Gold medal – first place	2011 Poland	Team competition

Ilona Kalyuvna Korstin (Russian: Илона Кальювна Корстин; born 30 May 1980), alternatively spelled Korstine, is a retired Russian basketball forward of Estonian origin, who competed for her native Russia at the 2004 Summer Olympics, the 2008 Summer Olympics, and the 2012 Summer Olympics, winning two bronze medals. She ended her career in 2013.

She is CEO at the VTB United League

== Career statistics ==
Legend
GP	Games played	GS	Games started	MPG	Minutes per game	RPG	Rebounds per game
APG	Assists per game	SPG	Steals per game	BPG	Blocks per game	PPG	Points per game
TO	Turnovers per game	FG%	Field-goal percentage	3P%	3-point field-goal percentage	FT%	Free-throw percentage
**Bold**	Career best	°	League leader

=== WNBA ===
WNBA regular season statistics
Year	Team	GP	GS	MPG	FG%	3P%	FT%	RPG	APG	SPG	BPG	TO	PPG
2001	Phoenix	12	0	6.3	.280	.333	.857	0.9	0.4	0.3	0.0	0.8	1.8
**Career**	1 year, 1 team	12	0	6.3	.280	.333	.857	0.9	0.4	0.3	0.0	0.8	1.8

== Honors and achievements ==
=== International ===
- Olympics Bronze Medal (2): 2004, 2008
- World Championship Silver Medal (2): 2002, 2006
- EuroBasket (3): 2003, 2007, 2011

=== Club ===
Bourges Basket

- Euroleague (1): 2001
- Ligue Féminine (2): 1999, 2000

VBM-SGAU Samara (CSKA Moscow)

- Euroleague (1): 2005
- Russian Premier League (3): 2004, 2005, 2006
- Russian Cup (4): 2004, 2006, 2007, 2008
- World League (4): 2003, 2004, 2005, 2007

Spartak M.R. Vidnoje

- Euroleague (1): 2010
- Europe SuperCup (2): 2009, 2010

Dynamo Moscow

- EuroCup (1): 2013

=== Individual ===
- Honored Master of Sports of Russia
- Medal of the Order For Merit to the Fatherland, 1st class (2 August 2009) - for outstanding contribution to the development of physical culture and sports, high achievements in sports at the Games of the XXIX Olympiad in Beijing in 2008
