= Angela Marino =

New Zealand basketball player

Personal information
- Born: 3 February 1986 (age 40) Auckland, New Zealand
- Listed height: 166 cm (5 ft 5 in)

Career information
- Playing career: 2004–2015
- Position: Guard

Career history
- 2004–2006: Canberra Capitals
- 2006–2007: Perth Lynx
- 2007–2015: Adelaide Lightning

Career highlights
- 2× WNBL champion (2006, 2008)

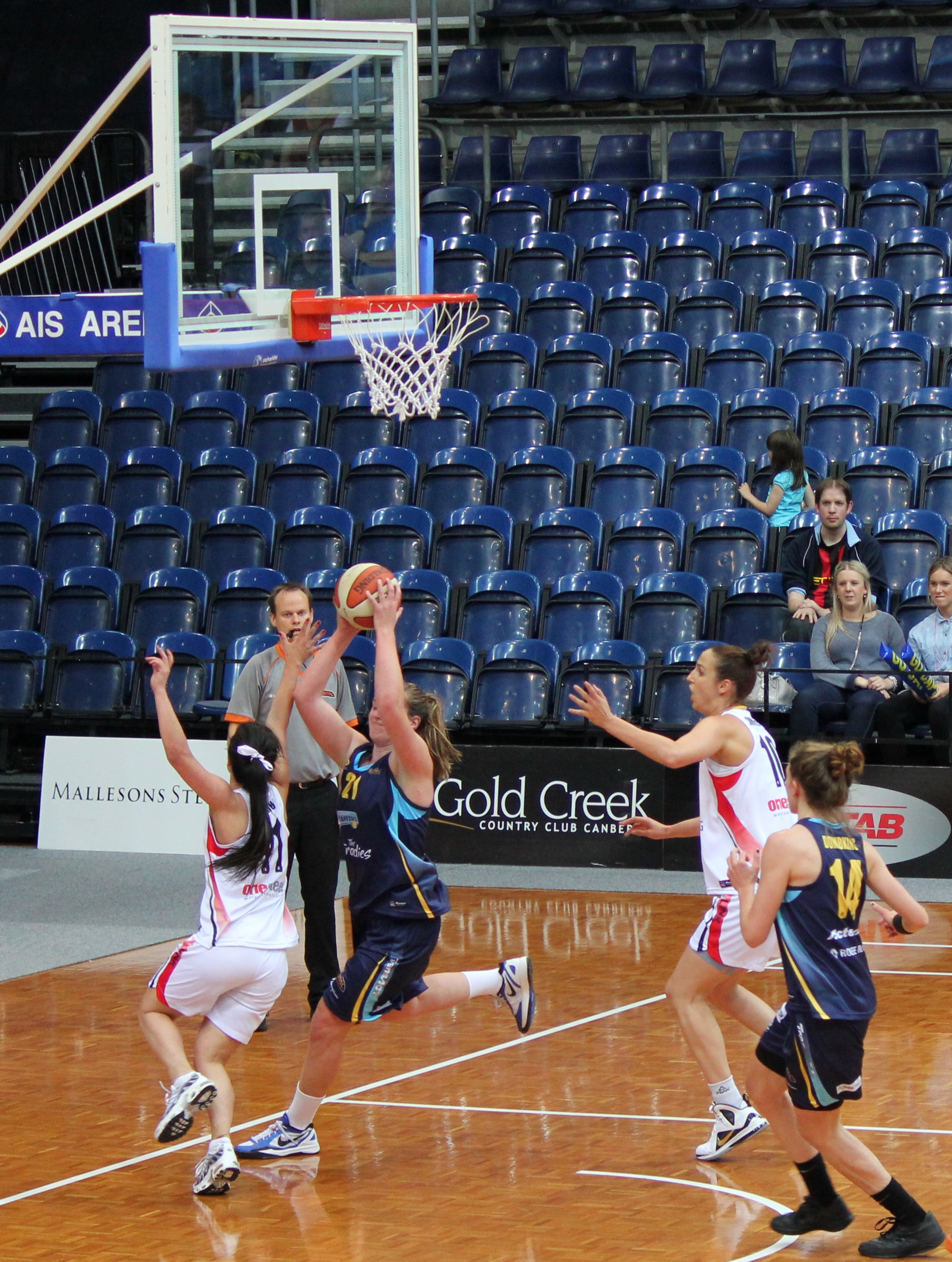
Marino on 9 November 2012 against Adelaide Lightning

Angela Marino (born 3 February 1986) is a New Zealand former professional basketball player. She represented the Canberra Capitals, Perth Lynx and Adelaide Lightning in the Women's National Basketball League (WNBL), winning two WNBL championships in 2006 and 2008.

== Early life ==
Marino was born in Waiuku to Italian parents before moving to Australia as an infant. She grew up playing for Whyalla Steelers and Sturt Sabres in South Australia.

== National team career ==
Marino represented the New Zealand Tall Ferns at the 2004 Athens Olympics and 2008 Beijing Olympics.

== Personal life ==
Marino is a dual passport holder with Italy, New Zealand and Australia.
