= Romana Hamzová =

Czech basketball player

Personal information
- Born: 17 August 1970 (age 56) Přerov, Czechoslovakia
- Listed height: 5 ft 9 in (1.75 m)
- Listed weight: 157 lb (71 kg)

Career information
- WNBA draft: 2000: 4th round, 52nd overall pick
- Drafted by: Orlando Miracle
- Position: Guard
- Stats at Basketball Reference
Medals
Representing Czech Republic
Women's basketball
European Championships
Silver medal – second place	2003 Greece	Team competition

Romana Hamzová (born 17 August 1970) is a Czech former basketball player who competed in the 2004 Summer Olympics.

== Personal life ==
Hamzová's daughter, Eliška Joklová, is a professional basketball player for the Minnesota Lynx of the WNBA.
