= Ivana Večeřová =

Czech basketball player

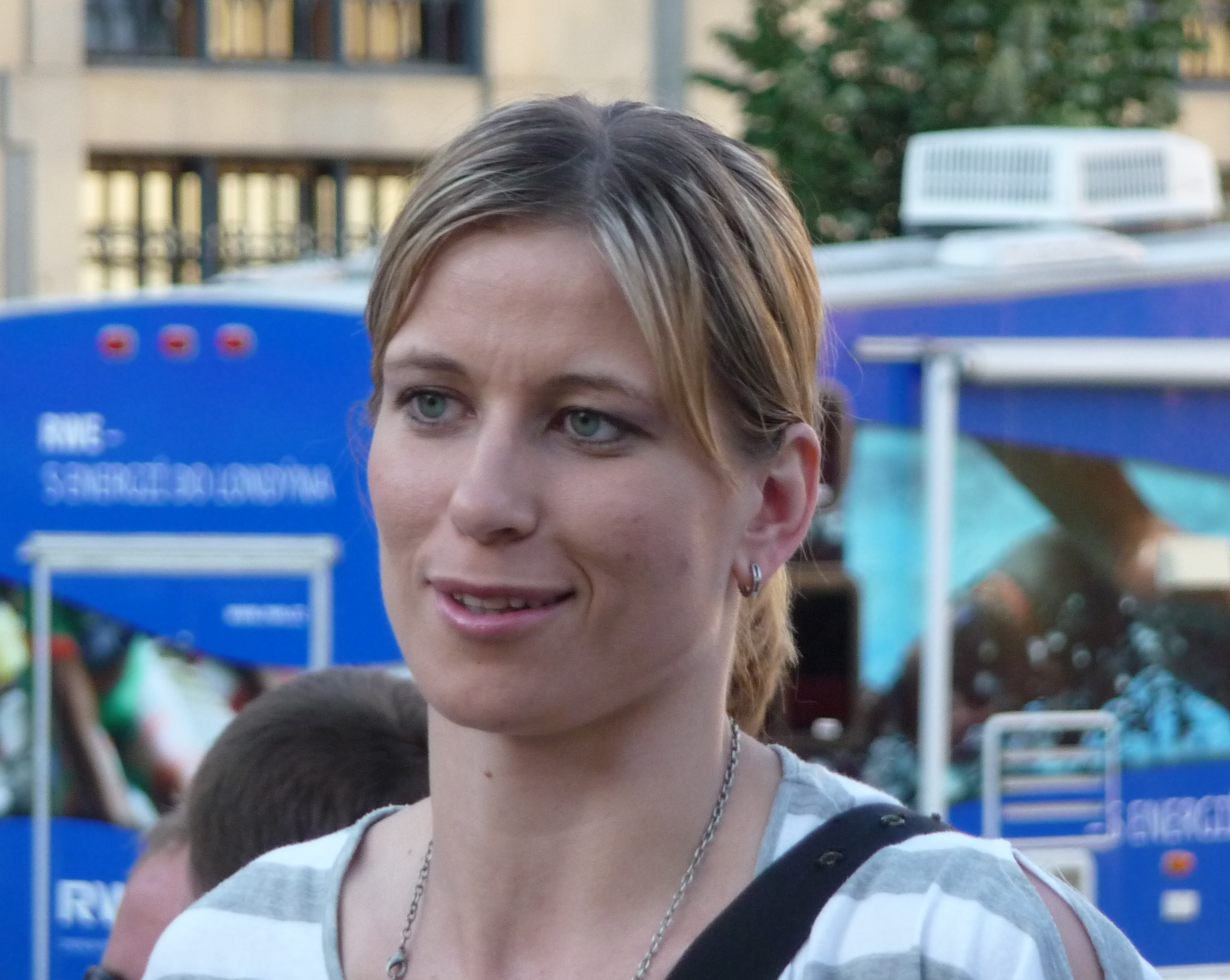

Valosun Brno
- Position: Center
- League: N/A

Personal information
- Born: 30 March 1979 (age 47) Šumperk, Czechoslovakia
- Listed height: 6 ft 4 in (1.93 m)
- Listed weight: 176 lb (80 kg)

Career information
- Playing career: 1998 present: KBC C&I 2018–present

Career history
- 1998–2008: Gambrinus Brno
- 2008–2009: Ros Casares
- 2009–2010: Galatasaray

Ivana Večeřová
Medal record

Representing Czech Republic

Women's basketball

World Championships
Silver medal – second place	2010 Czech Republic	National team

European Championships
Gold medal – first place	2005 Turkey	Team competition
Silver medal – second place	2003 Greece	Team competition

Ivana Večeřová (born 30 March 1979) is a Czech professional basketball player. She is a center playing for Valosun Brno.
