= Hellinikon Olympic Arena =

Sports arena in Athens, Greece

Hellinikon Olympic Arena Κλειστό Γήπεδο Ελληνικού
- National Athletic Center Elliniko "Makis Liougas"
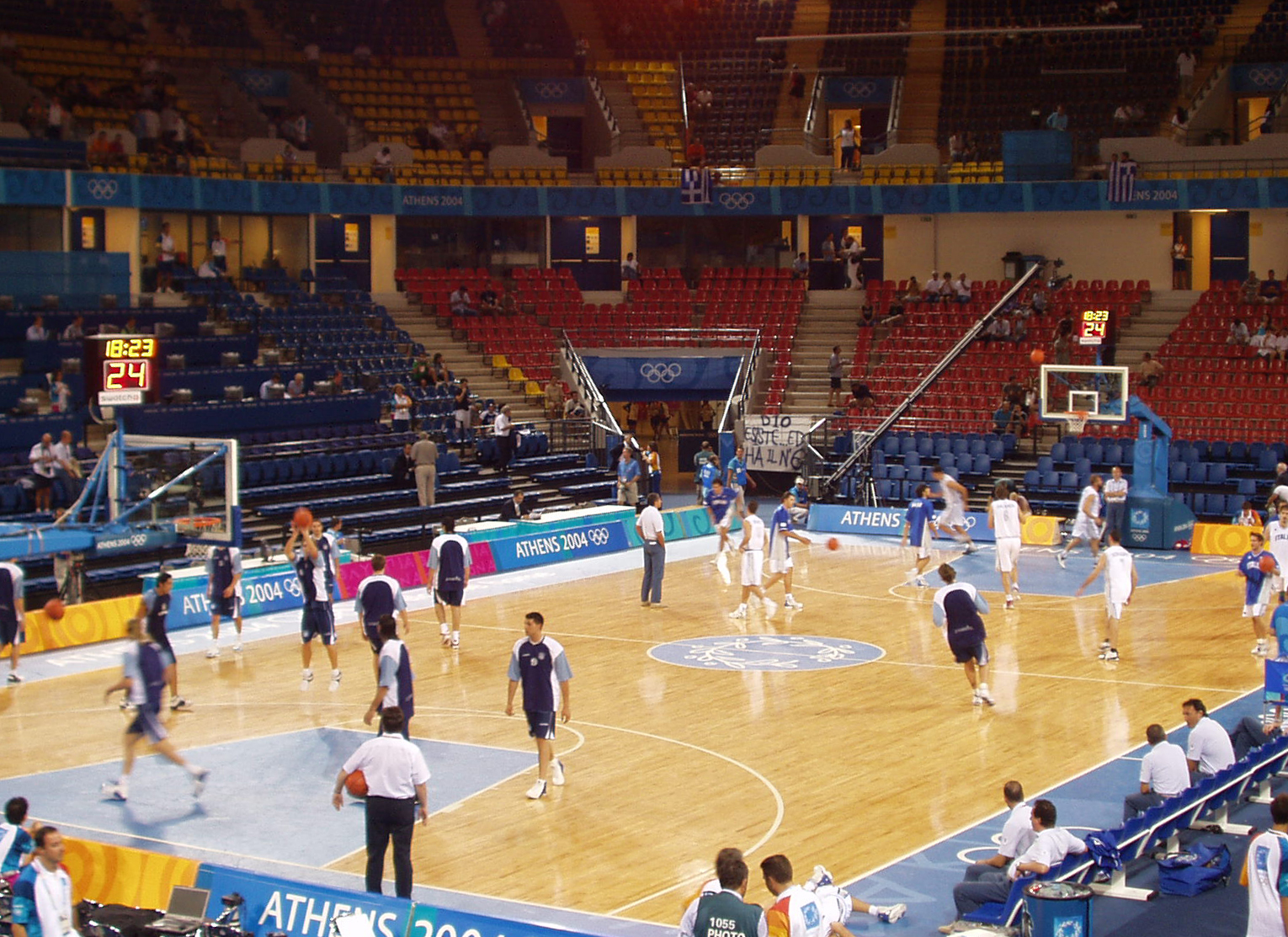
- Interior of the Hellinikon Indoor Arena
- Interactive map of Hellinikon Olympic Arena; Κλειστό Γήπεδο Ελληνικού
- Location: Elliniko, Greece
- Coordinates: 37°53′37″N 23°43′24″E
- Owner: Olympic Properties S.A.
- Operator: Olympic Properties S.A.
- Capacity: Basketball: 15,000; Handball: 13,500
- Surface: Parquet

Construction
- Groundbreaking: 2003
- Opened: June 4, 2004
- Demolished: 2022
- Cost: €49.000.000 (2003)
- Main contractors: Michaniki and EllisDon Construction Corporation

Tenants
- Hellenic Basketball Federation; Panionios (2006–2009); Panellinios (2007–2010); AEK Athens (2009–2011)

The Hellinikon Olympic Indoor Arena was a multi-use sports indoor arena that was located in Elliniko, a suburban town in the southern part of the Athens urban agglomeration, Greece. It was a part of the Hellinikon Olympic Complex, and it was located adjacent to the Helliniko Fencing Hall. It was approximately 10 miles from the Athens Olympic Village. It was built on the site of the former Hellinikon International Airport for the 2004 Summer Olympics and the 2004 Summer Paralympics.

The arena had in use its full seating capacity of 15,000 spectators for basketball, and 13,500 for handball during the 2004 Summer Olympic Games. However, only 12,500 seats were made available to the public for the basketball tournament, and only 10,700 for the handball tournament. After the Olympics, only the lower tier 8,500 seats have been made available by the arena's owners for public use. However, the arena can still hold 15,000 for basketball with the upper tier in full use. The arena was also known as the National Athletic Center Elliniko "Makis Liougas".

It was demolished in 2022.

== History ==
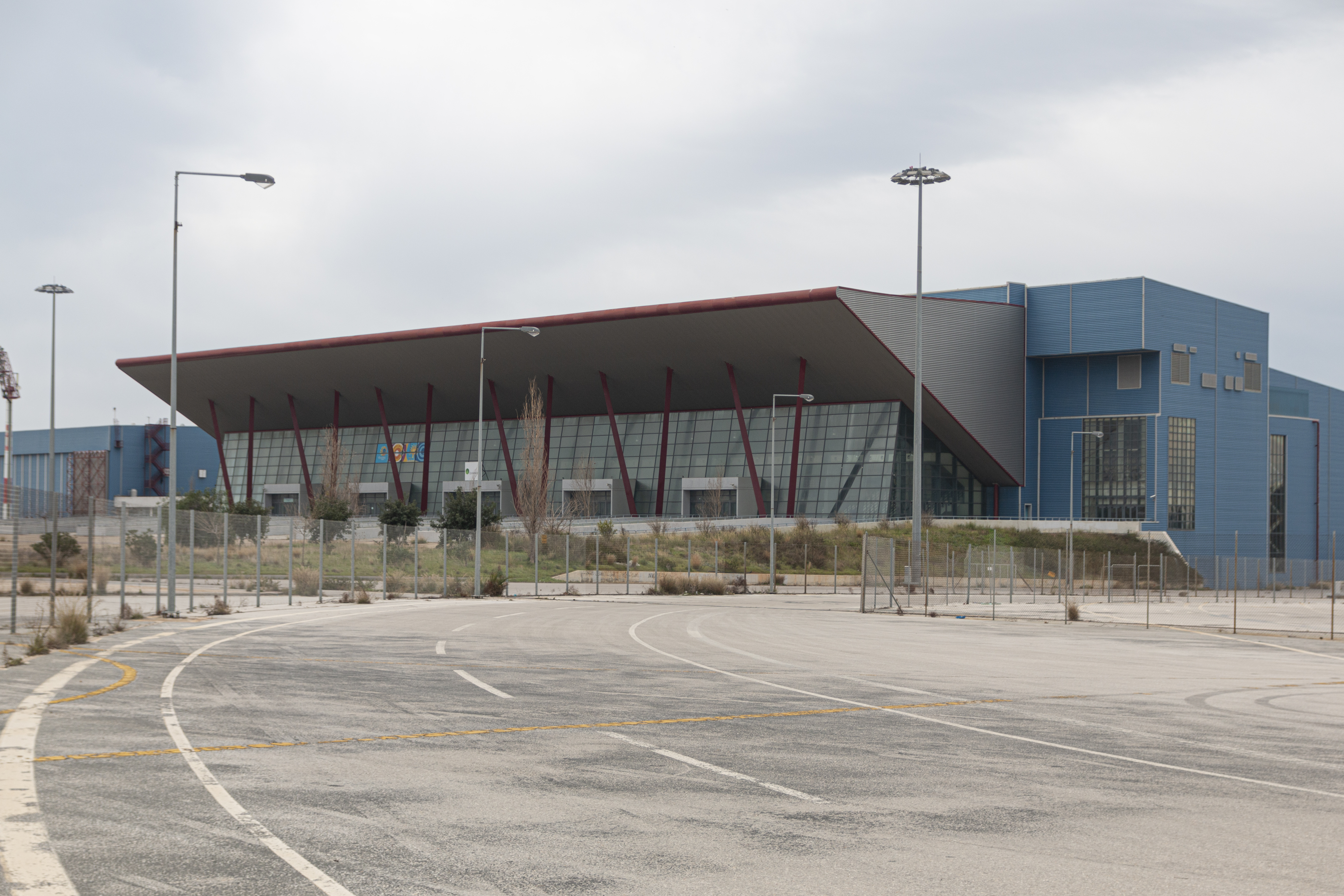
Exterior of the arena (December 2019)

=== Construction ===
The facility, which was built by Michaniki and EllisDon Construction Corporation was completed on May 31, 2004, and officially opened on July 30, 2004. It was built to be one of the most NBA-like arenas in Europe at the time. It was converted into a basketball arena by converting the old Athens Airport aircraft repair hangar of the Olympic Airways airline that had closed in the year 2001. The metal frame of the arena was the only part of the structure that remains from the original building. This was done to save in costs for both land and construction. The cost of the project was about €49 million euros in 2003.

=== 2004 Olympics ===
The arena hosted the basketball preliminary games and the handball finals. During the 2004 Summer Paralympics, it was also the venue used for wheelchair rugby.

=== Greek Basket League ===
The arena has been used as a home arena, at one time or another, of the Greek Basket League basketball teams Panionios, Panellinios and AEK Athens. It also hosted several finals matches of the Greek Cup.

== See also ==
- List of indoor arenas in Greece
