= Kim Yeong-ok =

South Korean basketball player

- Hangul: 김영옥
- RR: Gim Yeongok
- MR: Kim Yŏngok

Kim Yeong-ok
Medal record

Women's basketball

Representing South Korea

Asian Games
Silver medal – second place	2002 Busan	Team competition

Kim Yeong-ok (born 4 March 1974 in Chuncheon, South Korea) is a South Korean former basketball player who competed in the 2004 Summer Olympics and in the 2008 Summer Olympics.
