= Zuzana Klimešová =

Czech basketball player (born 1979)

Medal record

Representing Czech Republic

Women's basketball

European Championships
Gold medal – first place	2005 Turkey	Team competition
Silver medal – second place	2003 Greece	Team competition

Zuzana Klimešová (born 21 January 1979) is a Czech former basketball player who competed in the 2004 Summer Olympics and played in the Women's National Basketball Association for the Indiana Fever. She played college basketball in the United States at Vanderbilt University.

== Vanderbilt statistics ==
Legend
GP	Games played	GS	Games started	MPG	Minutes per game
FG%	Field goal percentage	3P%	3-point field goal percentage	FT%	Free throw percentage
RPG	Rebounds per game	APG	Assists per game	SPG	Steals per game
BPG	Blocks per game	PPG	Points per game	**Bold**	Career high

Year	Team	GP	Points	FG%	3P%	FT%	RPG	APG	SPG	BPG	PPG
1998-99	Vanderbilt	27	269	49.3	0.0	0.6	6.3	0.9	1.2	**0.9**	10.0
1999-00	Vanderbilt	34	475	55.7	**66.7**	69.9	7.4	2.4	1.3	0.4	14.0
2000-01	Vanderbilt	34	555	56.5	33.3	72.1	**8.1**	**3.5**	1.2	0.4	**16.3**
2001-02	Vanderbilt	**37**	**568**	**56.9**	33.3	80.3	7.2	3.0	**1.5**	0.3	15.4
Career	Vanderbilt	132	1867	55.3	34.0	72.3	7.3	2.5	1.3	0.5	14.1
