= Russia women's national basketball team =

Women's national basketball team representing Russia

Russia
- FIBA ranking: NR (18 March 2026)
- FIBA zone: FIBA Europe
- National federation: RBF
- Coach: Alexander Kovalev

Olympic Games
- Appearances: 5
- Medals: (bronze) Bronze: (2004, 2008)

World Cup
- Appearances: 4
- Medals: (silver) Silver: (1998, 2002, 2006)

EuroBasket
- Appearances: 15
- Medals: (gold) Gold: (2003, 2007, 2011); (silver) Silver: (2001, 2005, 2009); (bronze) Bronze: (1995, 1999)
Home	Away
Medal record
Event	1st	2nd	3rd
Olympic Games	0	0	2
FIBA World Cup	0	3	0
EuroBasket	3	3	2
Total	3	6	4

The Russia women's national basketball team is administered by the Russian Basketball Federation. The team has participated in four FIBA Women's World Cups and their best finish has been a silver medal in 1998, 2002 and 2006. In European Women Basketball Championship the Russian team won gold medals in 2003, 2007 and 2011, silver medals in 2001, 2005 and 2009, and bronze in 1995 and 1999. They have participated in five Olympic Games, winning two bronze medals.

After the 2022 Russian invasion of Ukraine, FIBA banned Russian teams and officials from participating in FIBA 3x3 Basketball competitions.

== Competition records ==
=== Olympic Games ===
Olympic Games
Year	Position	Pld	W	L
(United States) 1996	5th	8	6	2
(Australia) 2000	6th	7	3	4
(Greece) 2004	3rd place, bronze medalist(s)	8	6	2
(China) 2008	3rd place, bronze medalist(s)	8	6	2
(United Kingdom) 2012	4th	8	5	3
(Brazil) 2016	Did not qualify			
(Japan) 2020	Did not qualify			
(France) 2024	Suspended			
(United States) 2028	Suspended			
Total		39	26	13

=== FIBA Women's Basketball World Cup ===
FIBA World Cup					Qualification		
Year	Position	Pld	W	L	Pld	W	L
(Australia) 1994	Did not qualify						
(Germany) 1998	Silver medal	9	7	2			
(China) 2002	Silver medal	9	7	2			
(Brazil) 2006	Silver medal	9	5	4			
(Czech Republic) 2010	7th	9	7	2			
(Turkey) 2014	Did not qualify						
(Spain) 2018	Did not qualify						
(Australia) 2022	Expelled				2	1	1
(Germany) 2026	Banned				Banned		
(Japan) 2030	To be determined				To be determined		
Total		36	26	10	2	1	1

=== EuroBasket Women ===
EuroBasket Women					Qualification		
Year	Position	Pld	W	L	Pld	W	L
(Italy) 1993	7th	8	4	4	5	4	1
(Czech Republic) 1995	Bronze medal	9	7	2	5	3	2
(Hungary) 1997	6th	8	4	4	5	4	1
(Poland) 1999	Bronze medal	8	7	1	5	5	0
(France) 2001	Silver medal	8	6	2	6	5	1
(Greece) 2003	Gold medal	8	6	2	6	5	1
(Turkey) 2005	Silver medal	8	5	3			
(Italy) 2007	Gold medal	9	8	1			
(Latvia) 2009	Silver medal	9	7	2			
(Poland) 2011	Gold medal	9	7	2			
(France) 2013	13th	3	1	2			
(Hungary) (Romania) 2015	6th	10	5	5	4	3	1
(Czech Republic) 2017	9th	4	2	2	6	6	0
(Latvia) (Serbia) 2019	8th	6	2	4	6	6	0
(France) (Spain) 2021	6th	6	4	2	6	5	1
(Israel) (Slovenia) 2023	Banned				Banned		
(Czech Republic) (Germany) (Italy) (Greece) 2025	Banned				Banned		
(Belgium) (Finland) (Sweden) (Lithuania) 2027	Banned				Banned		
Total		113	75	38			

== 2021 roster ==
Roster for the EuroBasket Women 2021.

Russia women's national basketball team roster
Players
Coaches

Pos.	No.	Name	Age – Date of birth	Height	Club	Ctr.
SG	1	Daria Kurilchuk	23 – 14 February 1998	1.81 m (5 ft 11 in)	WBC Enisey	(Russia)
SF	4	Raisa Musina	23 – 31 March 1998	1.90 m (6 ft 3 in)	Dynamo Kursk	(Russia)
G	5	Marina Goldyreva	27 – 19 June 1993	1.69 m (5 ft 7 in)	WBC Dynamo Novosibirsk	(Russia)
SF	6	Kamilla Ogun	22 – 7 May 1999	1.81 m (5 ft 11 in)	BC Namur-Capitale	(Belgium)
C	7	Maria Vadeeva	22 – 16 July 1998	1.93 m (6 ft 4 in)	UMMC Ekaterinburg	(Russia)
PG	8	Ekaterina Fedorenkova	27 – 12 August 1993	1.77 m (5 ft 10 in)	NIKA Syktyvkar	(Russia)
SF	10	Anastasia Shilova	30 – 10 January 1991	1.86 m (6 ft 1 in)	Nadezhda Orenburg	(Russia)
SG	22	Elizaveta Komarova	26 – 1 February 1995	1.74 m (5 ft 9 in)	Nadezhda Orenburg	(Russia)
PF	55	Nina Glonti	24 – 14 January 1997	1.89 m (6 ft 2 in)	MBA Moscow	(Russia)
C	63	Aleksandra Shtanko	30 – 21 February 1991	1.91 m (6 ft 3 in)	MBA Moscow	(Russia)
C	97	Elizaveta Shabanova	23 – 7 December 1997	1.97 m (6 ft 6 in)	Dynamo Kursk	(Russia)
PG	99	Kseniia Levchenko	25 – 29 March 1996	1.67 m (5 ft 6 in)	Sparta & K	(Russia)

Head coach

- (Russia) Alexander Kovalev

Assistant coach(es)

- (Russia) Alexander Vasin
- (Russia) Dmitry Shumikhin

Legend

- Club – describes last
  club before the tournament
- Age – describes age
  on 17 June 2021

== See also ==
- Russia women's national under-19 basketball team
- Russia women's national under-17 basketball team
- Russia women's national 3x3 team
- Soviet Union women's national basketball team
