= Russia at the 2004 Summer Olympics =

- IOC code: RUS
- NOC: Russian Olympic Committee
- Website: www.olympic.ru (in Russian)

in Athens
- Competitors: 446 in 27 sports
- Flag bearers: Alexander Popov (opening); Andrey Moiseyev (closing)
- Medals Ranked 3rd: Gold 28 Silver 26 Bronze 36 Total 90

Summer Olympics appearances (overview)
- 1996; 2000; 2004; 2008; 2012; 2016; 2020–2024; 2028

Other related appearances
- Russian Empire (1900–1912); Soviet Union (1952–1988); Unified Team (1992); ROC (2020); Individual Neutral Athletes (2024)

Russia competed at the 2004 Summer Olympics in Athens, Greece, from 13 to 29 August 2004. This was the nation's third consecutive appearance at the Summer Olympics as an independent nation. The Russian Olympic Committee sent a total of 446 athletes to the Games, 244 men and 202 women, to compete in all sports, except baseball, field hockey, football, and softball.

Russia left Athens with a total of 90 Olympic medals – 28 golds, 26 silver, and 36 bronze – finishing second only to the United States in the overall medal standings, and third in the gold medal tally. The Russian delegation proved particularly successful in several sports, winning a total of nineteen medals in athletics, ten each in shooting and wrestling, seven in gymnastics and weightlifting, six in boxing, and five in cycling and judo. From the twenty-four sports played by the athletes, twelve of them won more than a single Olympic medal. Russian athletes dominated in rhythmic gymnastics and synchronized swimming, where they won gold medals in every event. Among Russia's team-based athletes, the indoor volleyball teams, along with men's handball and water polo and women's basketball, claimed Olympic medals in their respective tournaments.

Among the nation's medalists were synchronized swimming pair Anastasia Davydova and Anastasiya Yermakova, who both won gold in the women's duet and team routines, pole vaulter Yelena Isinbayeva, who later emerged as Russia's most promising track star in the decade, and Greco-Roman wrestler Khasan Baroev, who sought revenge for Russia on Aleksandr Karelin's defeat from Sydney to take home the super heavyweight title. Five-time Olympian Andrey Lavrov helped the men's handball team beat the Hungarians on his quest for the bronze medal and fourth medal overall in his fifth and final Olympic appearance.

As of 2021, this is Russia's best ever result in terms of overall medals and second-best result in terms of gold medals (after 2000).

== Medalists ==
Medal	Name	Sport	Event	Date
Gold	Alexey Alipov	Shooting	Men's trap	August 15
Gold	Mikhail Nestruyev	Shooting	Men's 50 m pistol	August 17
Gold	Viatcheslav Ekimov	Cycling	Men's road time trial	August 18
Gold	Karina Aznavourian; Oksana Yermakova; Tatiana Logounova; Anna Sivkova	Fencing	Women's team épée	August 20
Gold	Lioubov Galkina	Shooting	Women's 50 m rifle 3 positions	August 20
Gold	Natalya Sadova	Athletics	Women's discus throw	August 21
Gold	Sergey Fedorovtsev; Igor Kravtsov; Nikolay Spinyov; Aleksey Svirin	Rowing	Men's quadruple sculls	August 22
Gold	Yelena Isinbayeva	Athletics	Women's pole vault	August 24
Gold	Mikhail Ignatiev	Cycling	Men's points race	August 24
Gold	Dmitry Berestov	Weightlifting	Men's 105 kg	August 24
Gold	Olga Kuzenkova	Athletics	Women's hammer throw	August 25
Gold	Olga Slyusareva	Cycling	Women's points race	August 25
Gold	Anastasia Davydova; Anastasiya Yermakova	Synchronized swimming	Women's duet	August 25
Gold	Alexei Mishin	Wrestling	Men's Greco-Roman 84 kg	August 25
Gold	Khasan Baroev	Wrestling	Men's Greco-Roman 120 kg	August 25
Gold	Andrey Moiseev	Modern pentathlon	Men's event	August 26
Gold	Tatyana Lebedeva	Athletics	Women's long jump	August 27
Gold	Yelena Azarova; Olga Brusnikina; Anastasia Davydova; Maria Gromova; Mariya Kiselyova; Olga Novokshchenova; Anna Shorina; Anastasiya Yermakova	Synchronized swimming	Women's team	August 27
Gold	Yuriy Borzakovskiy	Athletics	Men's 800 m	August 28
Gold	Yelena Slesarenko	Athletics	Women's high jump	August 28
Gold	Aleksei Tishchenko	Boxing	Featherweight	August 28
Gold	Gaydarbek Gaydarbekov	Boxing	Middleweight	August 28
Gold	Olesya Belugina; Olga Glatskikh; Tatiana Kurbakova; Natalia Lavrova; Elena Murzina; Yelena Posevina	Gymnastics	Women's rhythmic team all-around	August 28
Gold	Mavlet Batirov	Wrestling	Men's freestyle 55 kg	August 28
Gold	Alexander Povetkin	Boxing	Super heavyweight	August 29
Gold	Alina Kabaeva	Gymnastics	Women's rhythmic individual all-around	August 29
Gold	Buvaisar Saitiev	Wrestling	Men's freestyle 74 kg	August 29
Gold	Khadzhimurat Gatsalov	Wrestling	Men's freestyle 96 kg	August 29
Silver	Vera Ilyina; Yuliya Pakhalina	Diving	Women's 3 m synchronized springboard	August 14
Silver	Mikhail Nestruyev	Shooting	Men's 10 m air pistol	August 14
Silver	Lioubov Galkina	Shooting	Women's 10 m air rifle	August 14
Silver	Natalia Goncharova; Yulia Koltunova	Diving	Women's 10 m synchronized platform	August 16
Silver	Vitaliy Makarov	Judo	Men's 73 kg	August 16
Silver	Svetlana Khorkina	Gymnastics	Women's artistic individual all-around	August 19
Silver	Aleksandr Blinov	Shooting	Men's 10 m running target	August 19
Silver	Tamerlan Tmenov	Judo	Men's +100 kg	August 20
Silver	Stanislava Komarova	Swimming	Women's 200 m backstroke	August 20
Silver	Natalia Zabolotnaya	Weightlifting	Women's 75 kg	August 20
Silver	Alexander Moskalenko	Gymnastics	Men's trampoline	August 21
Silver	Sergei Polyakov	Shooting	Men's 25 m rapid fire pistol	August 21
Silver	Olimpiada Ivanova	Athletics	Women's 20 km walk	August 23
Silver	Khadzhimurat Akkayev	Weightlifting	Men's 94 kg	August 23
Silver	Guzel Manyurova	Wrestling	Women's freestyle 72 kg	August 23
Silver	Svetlana Feofanova	Athletics	Women's pole vault	August 24
Silver	Tamilla Abbasova	Cycling	Women's sprint	August 24
Silver	Geidar Mamedaliyev	Wrestling	Men's Greco-Roman 55 kg	August 25
Silver	Denis Nizhegorodov	Athletics	Men's 50 km walk	August 27
Silver	Olga Fyodorova; Irina Khabarova; Larisa Kruglova; Yuliya Tabakova	Athletics	Women's 4×100 metre relay	August 27
Silver	Irina Simagina	Athletics	Women's long jump	August 27
Silver	Aleksandr Kostoglod; Aleksandr Kovalyov	Canoeing	Men's C-2 1000 m	August 27
Silver	Tatyana Tomashova	Athletics	Women's 1500 m	August 28
Silver	Natalya Antyukh; Tatyana Firova; Natalya Ivanova; Olesya Krasnomovets; Natalya Nazarova; Olesya Zykina	Athletics	Women's 4×400 metre relay	August 28
Silver	Russia women's national volleyball team: Yevgeniya Artamonova; Olga Chukanova; Yekaterina Gamova; Aleksandra Korukovets; Olga Nikolaeva; Yelena Plotnikova; Natalya Safronova; Lioubov Shashkova; Marina Sheshenina; Irina Tebenikhina; Yelizaveta Tishchenko; Yelena Tyurina	Volleyball	Women's tournament	August 28
Silver	Irina Tchachina	Gymnastics	Women's rhythmic individual all-around	August 29
Bronze	Vladimir Isakov	Shooting	Men's 10 m air pistol	August 14
Bronze	Olga Slyusareva	Cycling	Women's road race	August 15
Bronze	Pavel Kolobkov	Fencing	Men's épée	August 17
Bronze	Ludmila Ezhova; Svetlana Khorkina; Maria Kryuchkova; Anna Pavlova; Elena Zamolodchikova; Natalia Ziganshina	Gymnastics	Women's artistic team all-around	August 17
Bronze	Dmitri Nossov	Judo	Men's 81 kg	August 17
Bronze	Khasanbi Taov	Judo	Men's 90 kg	August 18
Bronze	Aleksey Dyachenko; Stanislav Pozdnyakov; Sergey Sharikov; Alexey Yakimenko	Fencing	Men's team sabre	August 19
Bronze	Dimitri Lykin	Shooting	Men's 10 m running target	August 19
Bronze	Zarema Kasaeva	Weightlifting	Women's 69 kg	August 19
Bronze	Tea Donguzashvili	Judo	Women's +78 kg	August 20
Bronze	Valentina Popova	Weightlifting	Women's 75 kg	August 20
Bronze	Renal Ganeyev; Youri Moltchan; Ruslan Nasibulin; Vyacheslav Pozdnyakov	Fencing	Men's team foil	August 21
Bronze	Sergei Alifirenko	Shooting	Men's 25 m rapid fire pistol	August 21
Bronze	Danil Burkenya	Athletics	Men's triple jump	August 22
Bronze	Anna Pavlova	Gymnastics	Women's vault	August 22
Bronze	Tatyana Lebedeva	Athletics	Women's triple jump	August 23
Bronze	Eduard Tyukin	Weightlifting	Men's 94 kg	August 23
Bronze	Natalya Antyukh	Athletics	Women's 400 m	August 24
Bronze	Dmitri Sautin	Diving	Men's 3 m springboard	August 24
Bronze	Gleb Pisarevskiy	Weightlifting	Men's 105 kg	August 24
Bronze	Yuliya Pakhalina	Diving	Women's 3 m springboard	August 26
Bronze	Varteres Samurgashev	Wrestling	Men's Greco-Roman 74 kg	August 26
Bronze	Aleksey Voyevodin	Athletics	Men's 50 km walk	August 27
Bronze	Tatyana Kotova	Athletics	Women's long jump	August 27
Bronze	Sergey Makarov	Athletics	Men's javelin throw	August 28
Bronze	Russia women's national basketball team: Anna Arkhipova; Olga Arteshina; Elena Baranova; Diana Goustilina; Maria Kalmykova; Elena Karpova; Ilona Korstin; Irina Osipova; Oxana Rakhmatulina; Tatiana Shchegoleva; Maria Stepanova; Natalia Vodopyanova	Basketball	Women's tournament	August 28
Bronze	Maxim Opalev	Canoeing	Men's C-1 500 m	August 28
Bronze	Aleksandr Kostoglod; Aleksandr Kovalyov	Canoeing	Men's C-2 500 m	August 28
Bronze	Russia men's national handball team: Pavel Bashkin; Mikhail Chipurin; Aleksandr Gorbatikov; Vyacheslav Gorpishin; Vitali Ivanov; Eduard Koksharov; Alexey Kostygov; Denis Krivoshlykov; Vasily Kudinov; Oleg Kuleshov; Andrey Lavrov; Sergey Pogorelov; Alexey Rastvortsev; Dmitri Torgovanov; Aleksandr Tuchkin	Handball	Men's tournament	August 28
Bronze	Makhach Murtazaliev	Wrestling	Men's freestyle 66 kg	August 28
Bronze	Sazhid Sazhidov	Wrestling	Men's freestyle 84 kg	August 28
Bronze	Sergey Kazakov	Boxing	Light flyweight	August 29
Bronze	Murat Khrachev	Boxing	Lightweight	August 29
Bronze	Oleg Saitov	Boxing	Welterweight	August 29
Bronze	Russia men's national volleyball team: Pavel Abramov; Sergei Baranov; Stanislav Dineykin; Andrey Egorchev; Aleksey Kazakov; Vadim Khamuttskikh; Taras Khtey; Aleksandr Kosarev; Aleksey Kuleshov; Sergey Tetyukhin; Konstantin Ushakov; Aleksey Verbov	Volleyball	Men's tournament	August 29
Bronze	Russia men's national water polo team: Roman Balashov; Aleksandr Fyodorov; Sergey Garbuzov; Dmitry Gorshkov; Nikolay Kozlov; Nikolay Maksimov; Andrei Rekechinski; Dmitri Stratan; Revaz Chomakhidze; Aleksandr Yeryshov; Vitaly Yurchik; Marat Zakirov; Irek Zinnurov	Water polo	Men's tournament	August 29

Medals by sport
Sport	1st place, gold medalist(s)	2nd place, silver medalist(s)	3rd place, bronze medalist(s)	Total
Athletics	6	7	6	19
Wrestling	5	2	3	10
Shooting	3	4	3	10
Boxing	3	0	3	6
Cycling	3	1	1	5
Gymnastics	2	3	2	7
Synchronized swimming	2	0	0	2
Weightlifting	1	2	4	8
Fencing	1	0	3	4
Modern pentathlon	1	0	0	1
Rowing	1	0	0	1
Judo	0	2	3	5
Diving	0	2	2	4
Canoeing	0	1	2	3
Swimming	0	1	0	1
Volleyball	0	1	1	2
Basketball	0	0	1	1
Handball	0	0	1	1
Water polo	0	0	1	1
Total	28	26	36	90

== Archery ==
Five Russian archers (two men and three women) qualified each for the men's and women's individual archery, and a spot for the women's team.

Men

Athlete	Event	Ranking round		Round of 64	Round of 32	Round of 16	Quarterfinals	Semifinals	Final / BM	
Athlete	Event	Score	Seed	Opposition Score	Opposition Score	Opposition Score	Opposition Score	Opposition Score	Opposition Score	Rank
Dmitry Nevmerzhitsky	Individual	639	44	Frankenberg (GER); L 135–140	Did not advance					
Balzhinima Tsyrempilov	Individual	668	7	Kalogiannidis (GRE); W 148–133	Andersson (SWE); W 162–160	Chen S-Y (TPE); L 161–169	Did not advance			

Women

Athlete	Event	Ranking round		Round of 64	Round of 32	Round of 16	Quarterfinals	Semifinals	Final / BM	
Athlete	Event	Score	Seed	Opposition Score	Opposition Score	Opposition Score	Opposition Score	Opposition Score	Opposition Score	Rank
Natalia Bolotova	Individual	625	33	Sut Txi (MAS); W 154–143	Park S-H (KOR); L 148–165	Did not advance				
Elena Dostay	Individual	609	50	Galinovskaya (RUS); L 136–153	Did not advance					
Margarita Galinovskaya	Individual	639	15	Dostay (RUS); W 153–136	Pfohl (GER); W 158–156	Lee S-J (KOR); L 154–165	Did not advance			
Natalia Bolotova; Elena Dostay; Margarita Galinovskaya	Team	1873	11	—N/a		Germany; L 234–238	Did not advance			

== Athletics ==
Russian athletes achieved qualifying standards in the following athletics events (up to a maximum of 3 athletes in each event at the 'A' Standard, and 1 at the 'B' Standard). On 23 August 2004, shot putter Irina Korzhanenko was stripped of her gold medal and received a lifetime ban by the International Olympic Committee after she tested positive for the steroid stanozolol. On 5 December 2012, Korzhanenko's teammate Svetlana Krivelyova was ordered to hand back her bronze, as the drug re-testings of her samples were positive.

Key

- Note–Ranks given for track events are within the athlete's heat only
- Q = Qualified for the next round
- q = Qualified for the next round as a fastest loser or, in field events, by position without achieving the qualifying target
- NR = National record
- N/A = Round not applicable for the event
- Bye = Athlete not required to compete in round

Men
Track & road events

Athlete	Event	Heat		Quarterfinal		Semifinal		Final	
Athlete	Event	Result	Rank	Result	Rank	Result	Rank	Result	Rank
Grigoriy Andreyev	Marathon	—N/a						2:16:55	19
Vladimir Andreyev	20 km walk	—N/a						1:21:53	7
Yuriy Andronov	50 km walk	—N/a						3:50:28	9
Ramil Aritkulov	800 m	1:49.25	7	—N/a		Did not advance			
Dmitriy Bogdanov	800 m	1:47.03	4	—N/a		Did not advance			
Yuriy Borzakovskiy	800 m	1:46.20	1 Q	—N/a		1:44.29	2 Q	1:44.45	1st place, gold medalist(s)
Viktor Burayev	20 km walk	—N/a						1:25:36	22
Dmitry Burmakin	Marathon	—N/a						2:31:51	73
Sergey Chepiga	110 m hurdles	13.59	5 q	13.55	5	Did not advance			
Anton Galkin	400 m	45.43	1 Q	—N/a		~~45.34~~	DSQ	Did not advance	
Boris Gorban	400 m hurdles	49.25	4 Q	—N/a		49.46	7	Did not advance	
Aleksandr Krivchinkov	1500 m	3:41.37	10	—N/a		Did not advance			
Mikhail Lipsky	400 m hurdles	49.00	3 Q	—N/a		49.10	6	Did not advance	
Oleg Mishukov	400 m	46.41	6	—N/a		Did not advance			
Denis Nizhegorodov	50 km walk	—N/a						3:42:50	2nd place, silver medalist(s)
Vladimir Parvatkin	20 km walk	—N/a						1:31:13	38
Evgeny Pechonkin	110 m hurdles	13.64	4 Q	13.53	5	Did not advance			
Igor Peremota	110 m hurdles	13.54	4 Q	13.64	7	Did not advance			
Pavel Potapovich	3000 m steeplechase	8:52.65	11	—N/a				Did not advance	
Oleg Sergeyev	200 m	20.95	6	Did not advance					
Leonid Shvetsov	Marathon	—N/a						2:15:28	13
Roman Usov	3000 m steeplechase	8:24.19	7	—N/a				Did not advance	
Aleksey Voyevodin	50 km walk	—N/a						3:43:34	3rd place, bronze medalist(s)
Andrey Yepishin	100 m	10.29	5 q	10.29	7	Did not advance			
Sergey Bychkov; Aleksandr Ryabov; Oleg Sergeyev; Andrey Yepishin	4 × 100 m relay	39.19	8	—N/a				Did not advance	
Aleksandr Larin; Ruslan Mashchenko; Oleg Mishukov; Andrey Rudnitskiy	4 × 400 m relay	3:03.35	4	—N/a				Did not advance	

Field events

Athlete	Event	Qualification		Final	
Athlete	Event	Distance	Position	Distance	Position
Aleksandr Borichevskiy	Discus throw	58.19	26	Did not advance	
Pyotr Brayko	High jump	2.20	=25	Did not advance	
Danil Burkenya	Triple jump	17.08	7 Q	17.48	3rd place, bronze medalist(s)
Pavel Chumachenko	Shot put	19.38	23	Did not advance	
Pavel Gerasimov	Pole vault	5.70	=1 Q	5.55	=13
Viktor Gushchinskiy	Triple jump	17.17	6 Q	17.17	7
Alexandr Ivanov	Javelin throw	82.18	6 Q	83.31	5
Sergey Kirmasov	Hammer throw	75.83	17	Did not advance	
Ilya Konovalov	Hammer throw	76.36	13	Did not advance	
Sergey Makarov	Javelin throw	86.08	2 Q	84.84	3rd place, bronze medalist(s)
Vitaliy Moskalenko	Triple jump	NM	—	Did not advance	
Igor Pavlov	Pole vault	5.70	6 Q	5.80	4
Yaroslav Rybakov	High jump	2.28	8 Q	2.32	6
Dmitry Shevchenko	Discus throw	NM	—	Did not advance	
Vitaliy Shkurlatov	Long jump	8.09	7 q	8.04	9
Pavel Sofin	Shot put	19.02	31	Did not advance	
Kirill Sosunov	Long jump	7.94	16	Did not advance	
Vadim Strogalev	Pole vault	NM	—	Did not advance	
Vyacheslav Voronin	High jump	2.28	12 Q	2.29	9
Yuriy Voronkin	Hammer throw	73.47	25	Did not advance	
Ivan Yushkov	Shot put	19.67	16	Did not advance	

Combined events – Decathlon

Athlete	Event	100 m	LJ	SP	HJ	400 m	110H	DT	PV	JT	1500 m	Final	Rank
Nikolay Averyanov	Result	10.55	7.34	14.44	1.94	49.72	14.39	39.88	4.80	54.51	4:31.02	8021	15
Nikolay Averyanov	Points	963	896	755	749	828	925	662	849	656	738	8021	15
Lev Lobodin	Result	11.05	6.86	DNS	—	—	—	—	—	—	—	DNF	
Lev Lobodin	Points	850	781	0	—	—	—	—	—	—	—	DNF	
Aleksandr Pogorelov	Result	10.95	7.31	15.10	2.06	50.79	14.21	44.60	5.00	53.45	4:47.63	8084	11
Aleksandr Pogorelov	Points	872	888	796	859	779	948	759	910	640	633	8084	11

Women
Track & road events

Athlete	Event	Heat		Quarterfinal		Semifinal		Final	
Athlete	Event	Result	Rank	Result	Rank	Result	Rank	Result	Rank
Tatyana Andrianova	800 m	2:03.77	1 Q	—N/a		1:58.41	2 Q	1:56.88	5
Natalya Antyukh	400 m	50.54	1 Q	—N/a		50.04	2 Q	49.89	3rd place, bronze medalist(s)
Yekaterina Bakhvalova	400 m hurdles	55.16	3 q	—N/a		54.98	6	Did not advance	
Yekaterina Bikert	400 m hurdles	54.95	2 Q	—N/a		53.79	4 Q	54.18	6
Galina Bogomolova	10000 m	—N/a						32:25.10	22
Yelena Bolsun	200 m	23.00	3 Q	23.26	6	Did not advance			
Svetlana Cherkasova	800 m	2:03.60	1 Q	—N/a		1:59.80	3	Did not advance	
Lidiya Grigoryeva	10000 m	—N/a						31:04.62	8
Albina Ivanova	Marathon	—N/a						2:47:23	40
Olimpiada Ivanova	20 km walk	—N/a						1:29:16	2nd place, silver medalist(s)
Irina Khabarova	100 m	11.32	2 Q	11.36	4	Did not advance			
Natalya Khrushcheleva	800 m	2:00.56	4 q	—N/a		2:00.68	5	Did not advance	
Yekaterina Kondratyeva	200 m	23.03	3 Q	23.37	7	Did not advance			
Mariya Koroteyeva	100 m hurdles	12.72	1 Q	—N/a		12.60	4 Q	12.72	4
Larisa Kruglova	100 m	11.23	3 Q	11.32	5	Did not advance			
Tatyana Levina	200 m	23.05	2 Q	23.23	5	Did not advance			
Natalya Nazarova	400 m	50.82	1 Q	—N/a		50.63	3 q	50.65	8
Yelena Nikolayeva	20 km walk	—N/a						1:32:16	17
Yuliya Pechonkina	400 m hurdles	53.57	1 Q	—N/a		53.31	1 Q	55.79	8
Lyudmila Petrova	Marathon	—N/a						2:31:56	8
Natalia Rusakova	100 m hurdles	12.90	2 Q	—N/a		12.76	5	Did not advance	
Gulnara Samitova-Galkina	5000 m	15:05.78	8 q	—N/a				15:02.30	6
Irina Shevchenko	100 m hurdles	12.82	2 Q	—N/a		12.67	2 Q	DNF	
Liliya Shobukhova	5000 m	15:01.86	4 Q	—N/a				15:15.64	13
Yuliya Tabakova	100 m	11.22	1 Q	11.25	4 q	11.25	8	Did not advance	
Tatyana Tomashova	1500 m	4:06.06	1 Q	—N/a		4:06.80	3 Q	3:58.12	2nd place, silver medalist(s)
Yuliya Voyevodina	20 km walk	—N/a						1:31:02	13
Olga Yegorova	1500 m	4:07.14	6 q	—N/a		4:05.57	7 q	4:05.65	11
Natalya Yevdokimova	1500 m	4:05.55	1 Q	—N/a		4:04.66	1 Q	3:59.05	4
Yelena Zadorozhnaya	5000 m	15:01.77	3 Q	—N/a				14:55.52	4
Svetlana Zakharova	Marathon	—N/a						2:32:04	9
Olga Fyodorova; Irina Khabarova; Larisa Kruglova; Yuliya Tabakova	4 × 100 m relay	42.12	1 Q	—N/a				42.27	2nd place, silver medalist(s)
Natalya Antyukh; Tatyana Firova*; Natalya Ivanova*; Olesya Krasnomovets; Natalya Nazarova; Olesya Zykina	4 × 400 m relay	3:23.52	1 Q	—N/a				3:20.16	2nd place, silver medalist(s)

Field events

Athlete	Event	Qualification		Final	
Athlete	Event	Distance	Position	Distance	Position
Olga Chernyavskaya	Discus throw	58.64	21	Did not advance	
Anna Chicherova	High jump	1.95	=4 Q	1.96	6
Svetlana Feofanova	Pole vault	4.40	=4 q	4.75	2nd place, silver medalist(s)
Viktoriya Gurova	Triple jump	14.04	21	Did not advance	
Yelena Isinbayeva	Pole vault	4.40	=4 q	4.91 WR	1st place, gold medalist(s)
Yekaterina Ivakina	Javelin throw	NM	—	Did not advance	
Anastasiya Ivanova	Pole vault	4.30	18	Did not advance	
Yelena Konevtseva	Hammer throw	67.83	16	Did not advance	
Irina Korzhanenko	Shot put	19.43	2 Q	~~21.06~~	DSQ
Tatyana Kotova	Long jump	6.79	3 Q	7.05	3rd place, bronze medalist(s)
Svetlana Krivelyova	Shot put	18.57	7 Q	~~19.49~~	DSQ
Olga Kuzenkova	Hammer throw	73.71 OR	1 Q	75.02 OR	1st place, gold medalist(s)
Tatyana Lebedeva	Long jump	6.95	1 Q	7.07	1st place, gold medalist(s)
Tatyana Lebedeva	Triple jump	14.71	5 Q	15.14	3rd place, bronze medalist(s)
Tatyana Lysenko	Hammer throw	66.82	19	Did not advance	
Tatyana Novoseltseva	High jump	1.92	13	Did not advance	
Anna Pyatykh	Triple jump	14.62	8 Q	14.79	8
Olga Ryabinkina	Shot put	18.00	14	Did not advance	
Natalya Sadova	Discus throw	64.33	2 Q	67.02	1st place, gold medalist(s)
Irina Simagina	Long jump	6.75	4 Q	7.05	2nd place, silver medalist(s)
Yelena Slesarenko	High jump	1.95	=4 Q	2.06 OR	1st place, gold medalist(s)
Oksana Yarygina	Javelin throw	57.57	26	Did not advance	
Oksana Yesipchuk	Discus throw	57.27	30	Did not advance	
Valeriya Zabruskova	Javelin throw	57.53	27	Did not advance	

Combined events – Heptathlon

Athlete	Event	100H	HJ	SP	200 m	LJ	JT	800 m	Final	Rank
Tatyana Gordeyeva	Result	DNF	DNS	—	—	—	—	—	DNF	
Tatyana Gordeyeva	Points	0	0	—	—	—	—	—	DNF	
Yelena Prokhorova	Result	13.84	1.79	13.67	24.71	6.21	47.86	2:11.31	6289	5
Yelena Prokhorova	Points	1001	966	772	914	915	819	946	6289	5
Svetlana Sokolova	Result	13.70	1.70	14.61	24.21	5.84	45.58	2:13.23	6210	10
Svetlana Sokolova	Points	1021	855	835	961	801	775	918	6210	10

== Badminton ==
Athlete	Event	Round of 32	Round of 16	Quarterfinal	Semifinal	Final / BM	
Athlete	Event	Opposition Score	Opposition Score	Opposition Score	Opposition Score	Opposition Score	Rank
Marina Yakusheva; Nikolai Zuyev	Mixed doubles	Bye	Nugroho / Widiowati (INA); L 15–12, 7–15, 5–15	Did not advance			

== Basketball ==
=== Women's tournament ===
Roster

The following is the Russia roster in the women's basketball tournament of the 2004 Summer Olympics.

Russia women's national basketball team – 2004 Summer Olympics roster
Players
Coaches

Pos.	No.	Name	Age – Date of birth	Height	Club	Ctr.
F	4	Olga Arteshina	21 – 27 November 1982	1.82 m (6 ft 0 in)	VBM-SGAU Samara	(Russia)
G	5	Oxana Rakhmatulina	27 – 7 December 1976	1.76 m (5 ft 9 in)	VBM-SGAU Samara	(Russia)
F	6	Natalia Vodopyanova	23 – 4 June 1981	1.90 m (6 ft 3 in)	Lotos VBW Clima Gdynia	(Poland)
G	7	Diana Goustilina	30 – 21 April 1974	1.85 m (6 ft 1 in)	UMMC Ekaterinburg	(Russia)
F	8	Elena Baranova (C)	32 – 28 January 1972	1.92 m (6 ft 4 in)	UMMC Ekaterinburg	(Russia)
C	9	Tatiana Shchegoleva	22 – 9 February 1982	1.92 m (6 ft 4 in)	VBM-SGAU Samara	(Russia)
G	10	Ilona Korstin	24 – 30 May 1980	1.83 m (6 ft 0 in)	VBM-SGAU Samara	(Russia)
C	11	Maria Stepanova	25 – 23 February 1979	2.03 m (6 ft 8 in)	VBM-SGAU Samara	(Russia)
C	12	Maria Kalmykova	26 – 14 January 1978	1.90 m (6 ft 3 in)	Dynamo Novosibirsk	(Russia)
F	13	Elena Karpova	24 – 14 June 1980	1.88 m (6 ft 2 in)	Lattes-Maurin Montpellier	(France)
F	14	Irina Osipova	23 – 25 June 1981	2.00 m (6 ft 7 in)	UMMC Ekaterinburg	(Russia)
G	15	Anna Arkhipova	31 – 27 July 1973	1.78 m (5 ft 10 in)	UMMC Ekaterinburg	(Russia)

Head coach

- (Russia) Vadim Kapranov

Assistant coach(es)

- (Russia) Valeriy Lunichkin

Legend

- (C) Team captain
- nat field describes country
  of last club
  before the tournament
- Age as of August 13, 2004

Group play

Pos	Team	Pld	W	L	PF	PA	PD	Pts	Qualification
1	Australia	5	5	0	418	313	+105	10	Quarterfinals
2	Russia	5	4	1	389	333	+56	9	Quarterfinals
3	Brazil	5	3	2	430	361	+69	8	Quarterfinals
4	Greece (H)	5	2	3	353	392	−39	7	Quarterfinals
5	Japan	5	1	4	381	485	−104	6	
6	Nigeria	5	0	5	335	422	−87	5	

Source: FIBA archive
Rules for classification: 1) points; 2) head-to-head points; 3) head-to-head goal average; 4) head-to-head number of points scored.
(H) Hosts

14 August 2004
20:00

Greece	62–69	Russia
Scoring by quarter: 16–12, 18–19, 9–25, 19–13
Pts: Kostaki 17; Rebs: Kligkopoulou, Samoroukova 7 Asts: Kostaki 5		Pts: Baranova 16; Rebs: Baranova 12; Asts: Arkhipova, Rakhmatulina 2

Olympic Indoor Hall, Athens
Attendance: 1,488
Referees:
Sean Corbin (United States)
Alejandro Chiti (Argentina)

16 August 2004
22:15

Russia	56–75	Australia
Scoring by quarter: 12–21, 21–15, 15–16, 8–23
Pts: Korstin 12; Rebs: Korstin 9 Asts: Osipova, Rakhmatulina 3		Pts: Taylor 26; Rebs: Jackson, Taylor 10; Asts: Harrower 4

Olympic Indoor Hall, Athens
Attendance: 2,430
Referees:
Reynaldo Mercedes Sanchez (Dom. Republic)
Nancy Ethier (Canada)

18 August 2004
20:00

Brazil	67–77	Russia
Scoring by quarter: 17–21, 11–25, 20–17, 19–14
Pts: Arcain 19; Rebs: Oliveira 8 Asts: Luz 5		Pts: Arkhipova 20; Rebs: Stepanova 9 Asts: Arkhipova 3

Olympic Indoor Hall, Athens
Attendance: 1,350
Referees:
Jose Carrión (Puerto Rico)
Chantal Julien (France)

20 August 2004
9:00

Russia	94–71	Japan
Scoring by quarter: 29–21, 21–15, 24–15, 20–20
Pts: Baranova 22; Rebs: Stepanova 12; Asts: Shchegoleva 3		Pts: Hamaguchi 14; Rebs: Yabuuchi 4 Asts: Oyama, Tachikawa 2

Olympic Indoor Hall, Athens
Attendance: 185
Referees:
Abdelillah Chlif (Morocco)
Kim Ja Ok (South Korea)

22 August 2004
11:15

Nigeria	58–93	Russia
Scoring by quarter: 14–23, 17–20, 15–21, 12–29
Pts: Udoka 19; Rebs: Mohammed 8 Asts: Akiode, Umoh 3		Pts: Rakhmatulina 15; Rebs: Baranova 8 Asts: Karpova, Rakhmatulina 3

Helliniko Indoor Arena, Athens
Attendance: 382
Referees:
Dallas Pickering (New Zealand)
Shoko Suguro (Japan)

Quarterfinals

25 August 2004
16:45

Russia	70–49	Czech Republic
Scoring by quarter: 19–6, 18–14, 19–10, 14–19
Pts: Korstin 21; Rebs: Korstin, Stepanova 7 Asts: Arkhipova 4		Pts: Kulichová 9 Rebs: Veselá 9 Asts: Hamzová 3

Olympic Indoor Hall, Athens
Attendance: 5,200
Referees:
Jorge Vazquez (Puerto Rico)
Scott Butler (Australia)

Semifinals

27 August 2004
14:30

Russia	62–66	United States
Scoring by quarter: 15–16, 18–21, 11–14, 18–15
Pts: Shchegoleva 13; Rebs: Baranova, Stepanova 8 Asts: Baranova 6		Pts: Thompson 14; Rebs: Griffit, Leslie 7 Asts: Leslie 3

Olympic Indoor Hall, Athens
Attendance: 3,740
Referees:
Pablo Estevez (Argentina)
Christos Christodoulou (Greece)

Bronze medal game

28 August 2004
14:00

Russia	71–62	Brazil
Scoring by quarter: 18–20, 14–12, 15–14, 24–16
Pts: Goustilina 12; Rebs: Osipova 10; Asts: Arkhipova, Baranova 4		Pts: Castro Marques 16; Rebs: Oliveira 9 Asts: Castro Marques 6

Olympic Indoor Hall, Athens
Attendance: 7,250
Referees:
Corbin Sean (United States)
Nancy Ethier (Canada)

Won bronze medal

== Boxing ==
Russia sent eleven boxers to Athens. With three gold medals and three bronze medals, Russia was the second most successful nation at boxing in Athens, behind only Cuba. Like Cuba, Russia sent a boxer to Athens in each of the eleven weight classes. Only one of the Russians came away without any victories, as he faced a Cuban in the first round. In all, four Russian boxers fell to the Cuban team while only one Russian was able to win against the Cubans. In addition to the six medallists (the three gold medallists were undefeated while the three bronze medallists lost their semifinal bouts), three more Russians made it to the quarterfinals.

Athlete	Event	Round of 32	Round of 16	Quarterfinals	Semifinals	Final	
Athlete	Event	Opposition Result	Opposition Result	Opposition Result	Opposition Result	Opposition Result	Rank
Sergey Kazakov	Light flyweight	Calero (ECU); W 20–8	Castañeda (MEX); W 41–16	Jermia (NAM); W 18–11	Yalçınkaya (TUR); L 20–26	Did not advance	3rd place, bronze medalist(s)
Georgy Balakshin	Flyweight	Soltani (ALG); W 26–15	Rakhimzhanov (KAZ); W 29–20	Gamboa (CUB); L 18–26	Did not advance		
Gennady Kovalev	Bantamweight	Bye	Bouziane (ALG); W 23–20	Rigondeaux (CUB); L 5–20	Did not advance		
Aleksei Tishchenko	Featherweight	Belkheir (ALG); W 37–17	Imranov (AZE); W RSC	Jafarov (KAZ); W 36–26	Jo S-H (KOR); W 45–25	Kim S-G (PRK); W 39–17	1st place, gold medalist(s)
Murat Khrachev	Lightweight	Chen Tz (CHN); W 40–29	Little (AUS); W RSC	Rukundo (UGA); W 31–18	Kindelán (CUB); L 10–20	Did not advance	3rd place, bronze medalist(s)
Alexander Maletin	Light welterweight	Khoulef (EGY); W RSC	Blain (FRA); L 20–28	Did not advance			
Oleg Saitov	Welterweight	Miloud (MAR); W 30–15	Hikal (EGY); W 18–17	Husanov (UZB); W 22–14	Artayev (KAZ); L 18–20	Did not advance	3rd place, bronze medalist(s)
Gaydarbek Gaydarbekov	Middleweight	Camat (PHI); W 35–13	Abdurahmonov (UZB); W 33–19	N'Jikam (CMR); W 26–13	Prasathinphimai (THA); W 24–18	Golovkin (KAZ); W 28–18	1st place, gold medalist(s)
Evgeny Makarenko	Light heavyweight	Bye	Hernández (CUB); W 30–18	Ward (USA); L 16–23	Did not advance		
Aleksandr Alekseyev	Heavyweight	—N/a	Solís (CUB); L 21–24	Did not advance			
Alexander Povetkin	Super heavyweight	—N/a	Rozhnov (BUL); W RSC	Dildabekov (KAZ); W 31–15	Cammarelle (ITA); W 31–19	Aly (EGY); W WO	1st place, gold medalist(s)

== Canoeing ==
=== Sprint ===
Men

Athlete	Event	Heats		Semifinals		Final	
Athlete	Event	Time	Rank	Time	Rank	Time	Rank
Konstantin Fomichev	C-1 1000 m	3.48.690	1 Q	Bye		3:55.773	9
Maxim Opalev	C-1 500 m	1:48.144	1 Q	Bye		1:47.767	3rd place, bronze medalist(s)
Andrey Shkiotov	K-1 500 m	1:40.809	7 q	1:40.765	7	Did not advance	
Andrey Shkiotov	K-1 1000 m	3:35.708	4 q	3:35.349	7	Did not advance	
Vladimir Grushikhin; Anatoly Tishchenko	K-2 500 m	1:30.761	3 q	1:31.786	2 Q	1:31.048	9
Vladimir Grushikhin; Anatoly Tishchenko	K-2 1000 m	3:22.332	8 q	3:14.089	5	Did not advance	
Aleksandr Kostoglod; Aleksandr Kovalyov	C-2 500 m	1:40.128	3 Q	Bye		1:40.442	3rd place, bronze medalist(s)
Aleksandr Kostoglod; Aleksandr Kovalyov	C-2 1000 m	3:31.023	2 Q	Bye		3:42.990	2nd place, silver medalist(s)

Women

Athlete	Event	Heats		Semifinals		Final	
Athlete	Event	Time	Rank	Time	Rank	Time	Rank
Olga Kostenko	K-1 500 m	1:58.520	6 q	1:55.766	6	Did not advance	

Qualification Legend: Q = Qualify to final; q = Qualify to semifinal

== Cycling ==
=== Road ===
Men

Athlete	Event	Time	Rank
Viatcheslav Ekimov	Road race	Did not finish	
Viatcheslav Ekimov	Time trial	57:50.58	1st place, gold medalist(s)
Vladimir Karpets	Road race	Did not finish	
Alexandr Kolobnev	Road race	5:41:56	10
Denis Menchov	Road race	Did not finish	
Evgeni Petrov	Road race	5:41:56	37
Evgeni Petrov	Time trial	1:02:50.32	29

Women

Athlete	Event	Time	Rank
Svetlana Bubnenkova	Road race	Did not finish	
Olga Slyusareva	Road race	3:25:03	3rd place, bronze medalist(s)
Olga Slyusareva	Time trial	32:51.06	12
Zulfiya Zabirova	Road race	3:28:39	39
Zulfiya Zabirova	Time trial	32:30.08	8

=== Track ===
Sprint

Athlete	Event	Qualification		Round 1	Repechage 1	Quarterfinals	Semifinals	Final	
Athlete	Event	Time Speed (km/h)	Rank	Opposition Time Speed (km/h)	Opposition Time Speed (km/h)	Opposition Time Speed (km/h)	Opposition Time Speed (km/h)	Opposition Time Speed (km/h)	Rank
Tamilla Abbasova	Women's sprint	11.364; 63.357	3	Pendleton (GBR); W 11.714; 61.464	Bye	Krupeckaitė (LTU); W 11.993, L, W 11.914	Grankovskaya (RUS); L, W 11.965, W 11.894	Muenzer (CAN); L, L	2nd place, silver medalist(s)
Svetlana Grankovskaya	Women's sprint	11.456; 62.849	7	Krupeckaitė (LTU); L	Reed (USA); Radanova (BUL); W 12.015; 59.925	Tsylinskaya (BLR); W 11.945, W 12.085	Abbasova (RUS); W 11.893, L, L	Meares (AUS); L, L	4

Pursuit

Athlete	Event	Qualification		Semifinals		Final	
Athlete	Event	Time	Rank	Opponent Results	Rank	Opponent Results	Rank
Alexei Markov	Men's individual pursuit	4:25.520	10	Did not advance			
Olga Slyusareva	Women's individual pursuit	3:35.177	8 Q	Ulmer (NZL); 3:36.263	6	Did not advance	
Elena Tchalykh	Women's individual pursuit	3:33.709	5 Q	Bates (AUS); 3:36.442	7	Did not advance	
Vladislav Borisov; Alexander Khatuntsev; Alexei Markov; Andrey Minashkin	Men's team pursuit	4:09.394	9	Did not advance			

Time trial

Athlete	Event	Time	Rank
Tamilla Abbasova	Women's time trial	35.147	12
Svetlana Grankovskaya	Women's time trial	34.797	9

Omnium

Athlete	Event	Points	Laps	Rank
Mikhail Ignatiev	Men's points race	93	4	1st place, gold medalist(s)
Olga Slyusareva	Women's points race	20	0	1st place, gold medalist(s)
Oleg Grishkin; Alexey Shmidt	Men's madison	1	−2	17

=== Mountain biking ===
Athlete	Event	Time	Rank
Yuri Trofimov	Men's cross-country	2:27:46	27
Irina Kalentieva	Women's cross-country	2:08:57	13

== Diving ==
Russian divers qualified for eight individual spots at the 2004 Olympic Games. Four Russian synchronized diving teams qualified through the 2004 FINA Diving World Cup.

Men

Athlete	Event	Preliminaries		Semifinals		Final	
Athlete	Event	Points	Rank	Points	Rank	Points	Rank
Aleksandr Dobroskok	3 m springboard	489.75	3 Q	717.84	3 Q	697.29	7
Dmitri Sautin	3 m springboard	450.06	6 Q	706.44	4 Q	753.27	3rd place, bronze medalist(s)
Dmitriy Dobroskok	10 m platform	445.68	8 Q	635.55	8 Q	622.23	11
Gleb Galperin	10 m platform	427.68	13 Q	607.62	13	Did not advance	
Aleksandr Dobroskok; Dmitri Sautin	3 m synchronized springboard	—N/a				312.24	7
Dmitriy Dobroskok; Gleb Galperin	10 m synchronized platform	—N/a				348.60	6

Women

Athlete	Event	Preliminaries		Semifinals		Final	
Athlete	Event	Points	Rank	Points	Rank	Points	Rank
Vera Ilyina	3 m springboard	311.97	4 Q	537.87	7 Q	589.11	4
Yuliya Pakhalina	3 m springboard	347.04	1 Q	584.46	1 Q	610.62	3rd place, bronze medalist(s)
Yulia Koltunova	10 m platform	257.55	27	Did not advance			
Svetlana Timoshinina	10 m platform	289.68	19	Did not advance			
Vera Ilyina; Yuliya Pakhalina	3 m synchronized springboard	—N/a				330.84	2nd place, silver medalist(s)
Natalia Goncharova; Yulia Koltunova	10 m synchronized platform	—N/a				340.92	2nd place, silver medalist(s)

== Equestrian ==
=== Dressage ===
Athlete	Horse	Event	Grand Prix		Grand Prix Special		Grand Prix Freestyle		Overall	
Athlete	Horse	Event	Score	Rank	Score	Rank	Score	Rank	Score	Rank
Alexandra Korelova	Balagur	Individual	68.250	23 Q	67.085	23	Did not advance			
Elena Sidneva	Condor	Individual	66.583	31	Did not advance					

=== Show jumping ===
Athlete	Horse	Event	Qualification								Final					Total	
Athlete	Horse	Event	Round 1		Round 2			Round 3			Round A		Round B			Total	
Athlete	Horse	Event	Penalties	Rank	Penalties	Total	Rank	Penalties	Total	Rank	Penalties	Rank	Penalties	Total	Rank	Penalties	Rank
Vladimir Tuganov	Leroy Brown	Individual	15	68	8	23	=52 Q	9	32	46 Q	13	35	Did not advance				

== Fencing ==
Men

Athlete	Event	Round of 64	Round of 32	Round of 16	Quarterfinal	Semifinal	Final / BM	
Athlete	Event	Opposition Score	Opposition Score	Opposition Score	Opposition Score	Opposition Score	Opposition Score	Rank
Pavel Kolobkov	Individual épée	Bye	Robinson (AUS); W 15–5	Turchin (RUS); W 15–10	Thompson (USA); W 15–11	Wang L (CHN); L 10–15	Boisse (FRA); W 15–8	3rd place, bronze medalist(s)
Sergey Kochetkov	Individual épée	Rami (MAR); W 15–6	Jeannet (FRA); L 11–15	Did not advance				
Igor Turchin	Individual épée	Bye	Kelsey (USA); W 15–11	Kolobkov (RUS); L 10–15	Did not advance			
Pavel Kolobkov; Sergey Kochetkov; Igor Turchin	Team épée	—N/a			Egypt; W 41–30	Hungary; L 34–38	Germany; L 29–37	4
Renal Ganeyev	Individual foil	Bye	Bißdorf (GER); W 15–11	Ota (JPN); W 15–8	Vanni (ITA); W 15–14	Sanzo (ITA); L 12–15	Cassarà (ITA); L 12–15	4
Youri Moltchan	Individual foil	Bye	Ha C-D (KOR); L 13–15	Did not advance				
Ruslan Nasibulin	Individual foil	Bye	Choi B-C (KOR); L 12–15	Did not advance				
Renal Ganeyev; Youri Moltchan; Ruslan Nasibulin; Vyacheslav Pozdnyakov	Team foil	—N/a			France; W 45–38	Italy; L 27–45	United States; W 45–38	3rd place, bronze medalist(s)
Aleksey Dyachenko	Individual sabre	Bye	Kaliuzhniy (UKR); L 10–15	Did not advance				
Stanislav Pozdnyakov	Individual sabre	Bye	Nagara (JPN); W 15–9	Lee (USA); W 15–9	Lapkes (BLR); L 9–15	Did not advance		
Sergey Sharikov	Individual sabre	Bye	Maya (CUB); W 15–13	Pillet (FRA); W 15–11	Montano (ITA); L 13–15	Did not advance		
Aleksey Dyachenko; Stanislav Pozdnyakov; Sergey Sharikov; Alexey Yakimenko	Team sabre	—N/a			Greece; W 45–22	Italy; L 42–45	United States; W 45–44	3rd place, bronze medalist(s)

Women

Athlete	Event	Round of 64	Round of 32	Round of 16	Quarterfinal	Semifinal	Final / BM	
Athlete	Event	Opposition Score	Opposition Score	Opposition Score	Opposition Score	Opposition Score	Opposition Score	Rank
Oksana Yermakova	Individual épée	Bye	Kim H-J (KOR); L 7–9	Did not advance				
Tatiana Logounova	Individual épée	Bye	James (USA); W 15–11	Hristou (GRE); L 10–15	Did not advance			
Anna Sivkova	Individual épée	Bye	Nagy (HUN); L 10–15	Did not advance				
Karina Aznavourian; Oksana Yermakova; Tatiana Logounova; Anna Sivkova	Team épée	—N/a			South Korea; W 37–31	Canada; W 25–18	Germany; W 34–28	1st place, gold medalist(s)
Svetlana Boyko	Individual foil	—N/a	El Gammal (EGY); W 13–7	Varga (HUN); L 9–15	Did not advance			
Yekaterina Yusheva	Individual foil	—N/a	Rentoumi (GRE); W 15–4	Mohamed (HUN); L 9–14	Did not advance			
Elena Nechaeva	Individual sabre	—N/a	Bye	Bond-Williams (GBR); W 15–12	Tan X (CHN); L 7–15	Did not advance		

== Gymnastics ==
=== Artistic ===
Men
Team

Athlete	Event	Qualification								Final							
Athlete	Event	Apparatus						Total	Rank	Apparatus						Total	Rank
Athlete	Event	F	PH	R	V	PB	HB	Total	Rank	F	PH	R	V	PB	HB	Total	Rank
Alexei Bondarenko	Team	9.662	8.650	9.662	9.825 Q	9.537	9.600	56.936	9 Q	—N/a	9.112	—N/a	9.325	9.225	9.737	—N/a	
Maksim Devyatovskiy	Team	8.950	9.237	9.675	8.975	9.462	9.312	55.611	26	9.325	9.512	9.625	—N/a				
Anton Golotsutskov	Team	9.462	9.487	9.625	9.762	7.737	—N/a			8.975	—N/a		9.737	—N/a			
Georgy Grebenkov	Team	9.562	8.300	9.712	9.400	9.687	9.487	56.148	20 Q	9.062	—N/a	9.675	—N/a	9.662	9.512	—N/a	
Alexei Nemov	Team	—N/a	9.450	—N/a		9.700	9.737 Q	—N/a		—N/a	9.037	—N/a		9.525	9.750	—N/a	
Aleksandr Safoshkin	Team	—N/a		9.750 Q	9.212	—N/a				—N/a		9.750	9.252	—N/a			
Total	Team	37.636	36.824	38.799	38.199	38.386	38.136	227.980	6 Q	27.362	27.661	29.050	28.324	28.412	29.999	169.808	6

Individual finals

Athlete	Event	Apparatus						Total	Rank
Athlete	Event	F	PH	R	V	PB	HB	Total	Rank
Alexei Bondarenko	All-around	9.600	9.150	9.600	9.400	9.450	9.600	56.800	13
Alexei Bondarenko	Vault	—N/a			4.550	—N/a		4.550	8
Georgy Grebenkov	All-around	9.587	9.125	9.662	9.437	9.650	9.362	56.823	12
Alexei Nemov	Horizontal bar	—N/a					9.762	9.762	5
Aleksandr Safoshkin	Rings	—N/a		9.750	—N/a			9.750	7

Women
Team

Athlete	Event	Qualification						Final					
Athlete	Event	Apparatus				Total	Rank	Apparatus				Total	Rank
Athlete	Event	V	UB	BB	F	Total	Rank	V	UB	BB	F	Total	Rank
Ludmila Ezhova	Team	—N/a	9.475	9.462	—N/a	—N/a		—N/a	9.437	9.437	—N/a		
Svetlana Khorkina	Team	9.512	9.750 Q	9.137	9.437	37.836	5 Q	9.375	9.650	9.437	9.600	—N/a	
Maria Kryuchkova	Team	9.200	—N/a		7.975	—N/a		Did not compete					
Anna Pavlova	Team	9.437 Q	9.237	9.637 Q	9.400	37.711	7 Q	9.425	—N/a	9.637	9.275	—N/a	
Elena Zamolodchikova	Team	9.462 Q	9.150	9.062	9.200	36.874	20	9.525	—N/a		9.387	—N/a	
Natalia Ziganshina	Team	9.375	9.087	8.962	8.687	36.111	32	—N/a	9.050	—N/a			
Total	Team	37.786	37.612	37.298	36.724	149.420	4 Q	28.325	28.137	28.511	28.262	113.325	3rd place, bronze medalist(s)

Individual finals

Athlete	Event	Apparatus				Total	Rank
Athlete	Event	V	UB	BB	F	Total	Rank
Svetlana Khorkina	All-around	9.462	9.725	9.462	9.562	38.211	2nd place, silver medalist(s)
Svetlana Khorkina	Uneven bars	—N/a	8.925	—N/a		8.925	8
Anna Pavlova	All-around	9.425	9.337	9.650	9.612	38.024	4
Anna Pavlova	Vault	9.475	—N/a			9.475	3rd place, bronze medalist(s)
Anna Pavlova	Balance beam	—N/a		9.587	—N/a	9.587	4
Elena Zamolodchikova	Vault	9.412	—N/a			9.412	4

=== Rhythmic ===
Athlete	Event	Qualification						Final					
Athlete	Event	Hoop	Ball	Clubs	Ribbon	Total	Rank	Hoop	Ball	Clubs	Ribbon	Total	Rank
Alina Kabaeva	Individual	26.050	27.250	26.475	26.100	105.875	1 Q	26.800	27.350	27.150	27.100	108.400	1st place, gold medalist(s)
Irina Tchachina	Individual	26.450	26.700	25.800	26.725	105.675	2 Q	27.100	27.100	26.825	26.300	107.325	2nd place, silver medalist(s)

Athlete	Event	Qualification				Final			
Athlete	Event	5 ribbons	3 hoops 2 balls	Total	Rank	5 ribbons	3 hoops 2 balls	Total	Rank
Olesya Belugina; Olga Glatskikh; Tatiana Kurbakova; Natalia Lavrova; Elena Murzina; Yelena Posevina	Team	24.700	25.175	49.875	1 Q	25.300	25.800	51.100	1st place, gold medalist(s)

=== Trampoline ===
Athlete	Event	Qualification		Final	
Athlete	Event	Score	Rank	Score	Rank
Alexander Moskalenko	Men's	68.90	4 Q	41.20	2nd place, silver medalist(s)
Alexander Rusakov	Men's	69.00	3 Q	40.20	5
Natalia Chernova	Women's	66.80	1 Q	38.60	4
Irina Karavayeva	Women's	39.90	15	Did not advance	

== Handball ==
=== Men's tournament ===
Roster

The following is the Russia roster in the men's handball tournament of the 2004 Summer Olympics.

Head coaches: Vladimir Maksimov

No.	Pos.	Name	Date of birth (age)	Height	App.	Goals	Club
1	GK	Andrey Lavrov	26 March 1962 (aged 42)	1.97 m			(Germany) SG Kronau/Östringen
3	CB	Vitali Ivanov	3 February 1976 (aged 28)	1.94 m			(Russia) Chekhovskiye Medvedi
5	CB	Oleg Kuleshov	15 April 1974 (aged 30)	1.84 m			(Germany) SC Magdeburg
6	RW	Denis Krivoshlykov	10 May 1971 (aged 33)	1.82 m			(Spain) CB Ademar León
8	RB	Alexandre Tuchkin	15 July 1964 (aged 40)	2.03 m			(Greece) Filippos Veria H.C.
9	LW	Vasily Kudinov	17 February 1969 (aged 35)	1.95 m			(Russia) Lukoil Dinamo Astrakhan
10	RW	Pavel Bashkin	1 September 1978 (aged 25)	1.87 m			(Russia) Lukoil Dinamo Astrakhan
11	P	Dmitri Torgovanov	5 January 1972 (aged 32)	2.00 m			(Germany) TUSEM Essen
13	CB	Alexander Gorbatikov	4 June 1982 (aged 22)	1.88 m			(Russia) Lukoil Dinamo Astrakhan
15	LB	Alexey Rastvortsev	8 August 1978 (aged 26)	2.00 m			(Russia) Chekhovskiye Medvedi
16	GK	Alexey Kostygov	5 July 1973 (aged 31)	1.92 m			(Russia) Chekhovskiye Medvedi
18	RB	Vyacheslav Gorpishin	20 January 1970 (aged 34)	2.00 m			(Germany) TSG Friesenheim
19	RB	Sergey Pogorelov	2 June 1974 (aged 30)	2.00 m			(Spain) BM Ciudad Real
20	P	Mikhail Chipurin	17 November 1980 (aged 23)	1.90 m			(Russia) Chekhovskiye Medvedi
23	LW	Eduard Kokcharov	4 November 1975 (aged 28)	1.85 m			(Slovenia) RK Celje

Group play

Pos	Team	Pld	W	D	L	GF	GA	GD	Pts	Qualification
1	Croatia	5	5	0	0	146	129	+17	10	Quarterfinals
2	Spain	5	4	0	1	154	137	+17	8	Quarterfinals
3	South Korea	5	2	0	3	148	148	0	4 (Note: South Korea 35–32 Russia)	Quarterfinals
4	Russia	5	2	0	3	145	145	0	4	Quarterfinals
5	Iceland	5	1	0	4	143	158	−15	2 (Note: Iceland 30–25 Slovenia)	
6	Slovenia	5	1	0	4	130	149	−19	2	

Rules for classification: 1) Points; 2) Head-to-head points; 3) Head-to-head goal difference; 4) Head-to-head goals scored; 5) Goal difference; 6) Goals scored; 7) Draw.
Notes:

14 August 2004; 14:30	Russia	28 - 25	Slovenia	Sports Pavilion, Athens; Referees: Bord, Buy (FRA)
14 August 2004; 14:30	Kokcharov 9	(16-13)	3 players with 4	Sports Pavilion, Athens; Referees: Bord, Buy (FRA)
14 August 2004; 14:30	2× (yellow card) 8× (suspension) 1× (red card)		3× (yellow card) 9× (suspension)	Sports Pavilion, Athens; Referees: Bord, Buy (FRA)

16 August 2004; 09:30	South Korea	35 - 32	Russia	Sports Pavilion, Athens; Referees: Hansson, Olsson (SWE)
16 August 2004; 09:30	Yoon K, Lee J 7	(16-16)	Kokcharov 6	Sports Pavilion, Athens; Referees: Hansson, Olsson (SWE)
16 August 2004; 09:30	3× (yellow card) 2× (suspension)		3× (yellow card) 2× (suspension)	Sports Pavilion, Athens; Referees: Hansson, Olsson (SWE)

18 August 2004; 19:30	Spain	29 - 26	Russia	Sports Pavilion, Athens; Referees: Nachevski, Nachevski (MKD)
18 August 2004; 19:30	3 players with 5	(11-11)	Rastvortsev 6	Sports Pavilion, Athens; Referees: Nachevski, Nachevski (MKD)
18 August 2004; 19:30	3× (yellow card) 6× (suspension)		3× (yellow card) 7× (suspension) 1× (red card)	Sports Pavilion, Athens; Referees: Nachevski, Nachevski (MKD)

20 August 2004; 19:30	Russia	25 - 26	Croatia	Sports Pavilion, Athens; Referees: Hansson, Olsson (SWE)
20 August 2004; 19:30	Torgovanov, Rastvortsev 6	(14-10)	Lacković 9	Sports Pavilion, Athens; Referees: Hansson, Olsson (SWE)
20 August 2004; 19:30	2× (yellow card) 5× (suspension)		3× (yellow card) 3× (suspension)	Sports Pavilion, Athens; Referees: Hansson, Olsson (SWE)

22 August 2004; 19:30	Russia	34 - 30	Iceland	Sports Pavilion, Athens; Referees: Bord, Buy (FRA)
22 August 2004; 19:30	Rastvortsev 10	(17-11)	Stefansson 10	Sports Pavilion, Athens; Referees: Bord, Buy (FRA)
22 August 2004; 19:30	3× (yellow card) 5× (suspension)		3× (yellow card) 2× (suspension)	Sports Pavilion, Athens; Referees: Bord, Buy (FRA)

Quarterfinals

24 August 2004; 22:05	France	24 - 26	Russia	Sports Pavilion, Athens; Referees: Nachevski, Nachevski (MKD)
24 August 2004; 22:05	Abati 6	(14-13)	Ivanov, Kokcharov 5	Sports Pavilion, Athens; Referees: Nachevski, Nachevski (MKD)
24 August 2004; 22:05	3× (yellow card) 2× (suspension)		3× (yellow card) 3× (suspension)	Sports Pavilion, Athens; Referees: Nachevski, Nachevski (MKD)

Semifinals

27 August 2004; 16:30	Germany	21 - 15	Russia	Helliniko Olympic Indoor Arena; Referees: Bord, Buy (FRA)
27 August 2004; 16:30	Kretzschmar 5	(9-10)	Torgovanov 5	Helliniko Olympic Indoor Arena; Referees: Bord, Buy (FRA)
27 August 2004; 16:30	3× (yellow card) 4× (suspension) 1× (red card)		2× (yellow card) 3× (suspension)	Helliniko Olympic Indoor Arena; Referees: Bord, Buy (FRA)

Bronze medal match

28 August 2004; 21:30	Hungary	26 - 28	Russia	Helliniko Olympic Indoor Arena; Referees: Bavas, Migas (GRE)
28 August 2004; 21:30	Pérez 10	(10-13)	Kokcharov 8	Helliniko Olympic Indoor Arena; Referees: Bavas, Migas (GRE)
28 August 2004; 21:30	2× (yellow card) 5× (suspension)		4× (yellow card) 4× (suspension)	Helliniko Olympic Indoor Arena; Referees: Bavas, Migas (GRE)

Won bronze medal

== Judo ==
Eleven Russian judoka (seven men and four women) qualified for the 2004 Summer Olympics.

Men

Athlete	Event	Round of 32	Round of 16	Quarterfinals	Semifinals	Repechage 1	Repechage 2	Repechage 3	Final / BM	
Athlete	Event	Opposition Result	Opposition Result	Opposition Result	Opposition Result	Opposition Result	Opposition Result	Opposition Result	Opposition Result	Rank
Evgeny Stanev	−60 kg	Ahamdi (MAR); W 1000–0000	Lounifi (TUN); W 1001–0000	Khergiani (GEO); L 0010–0120	Did not advance	Bye	Uematsu (ESP); L 0000–0001	Did not advance		
Magomed Dzhafarov	−66 kg	Ottiano (USA); W 0013–0001	Guimarães (BRA); W 0101–0010	Uchishiba (JPN); L 0000–1001	Did not advance	Bye	Lencina (ARG); L 0001–1001	Did not advance		
Vitaly Makarov	−73 kg	Alexanidis (GRE); W 1000–0000	Kevkhishvili (GEO); W 0221–0000	Damdin (MGL); W 0120–0000	Fernandes (FRA); W 1000–0001	Bye			Lee W-H (KOR); L 0001–1021	2nd place, silver medalist(s)
Dmitri Nossov	−81 kg	Tomouchi (JPN); W 0201–0001	Meloni (ITA); W 0011–0001	Canto (BRA); W 0110–0010	Iliadis (GRE); L 0000–1010	Bye			Azizov (AZE); W 0100–0020	3rd place, bronze medalist(s)
Khasanbi Taov	−90 kg	Despaigne (CUB); W 0011–0001	Zviadauri (GEO); L 0001–1001	Did not advance		Lepre (ITA); W 1001–0000	Demontfaucon (FRA); W 0100–0020	Kelly (AUS); W 0100–0001	Hwang H-T (KOR); W 1010–0000	3rd place, bronze medalist(s)
Dmitry Maksimov	−100 kg	Khosravinejad (IRI); W 0100–0001	Lemaire (FRA); L 0000–1001	Did not advance						
Tamerlan Tmenov	+100 kg	Munteanu (ROM); W 1110–0000	Hernandes (BRA); W 1110–0000	Pertelson (EST); W 1110–0001	Miran (IRI); W 1110–0010	Bye			Suzuki (JPN); L 0000–1000	2nd place, silver medalist(s)

Women

Athlete	Event	Round of 32	Round of 16	Quarterfinals	Semifinals	Repechage 1	Repechage 2	Repechage 3	Final / BM	
Athlete	Event	Opposition Result	Opposition Result	Opposition Result	Opposition Result	Opposition Result	Opposition Result	Opposition Result	Opposition Result	Rank
Lyubov Bruletova	−48 kg	Ouelogo (BUR); W 0201–0000	Żemła-Krajewska (POL); L 0000–1000	Did not advance						
Natalia Yukhareva	−57 kg	Bye	Kye S-H (PRK); L 0010–0031	Did not advance		Bezzina (MLT); W 1100–0000	Cox (GBR); W 1000–0000	Harel (FRA); L 0001–0020	Did not advance	
Vera Moskalyuk	−78 kg	Bye	Liu X (CHN); L 0000–0120	Did not advance		Zwiers (NED); W 0102–0000	Laborde (CUB); L 0000–1001	Did not advance		
Tea Donguzashvili	+78 kg	Ramadan (EGY); W 1001–0001	Choi S-I (KOR); W 1100–0001	Andolina (ITA); W 1010–0001	Tsukada (JPN); L 0000–0210	Bye			Yahyaoui (TUN); W 0210–0000	3rd place, bronze medalist(s)

== Modern pentathlon ==
Four Russian athletes qualified to compete in the modern pentathlon event through the European and UIPM World Championships.

Athlete	Event	Shooting (10 m air pistol)			Fencing (épée one touch)			Swimming (200 m freestyle)			Riding (show jumping)			Running (3000 m)			Total points	Final rank
Athlete	Event	Points	Rank	MP Points	Results	Rank	MP points	Time	Rank	MP points	Penalties	Rank	MP points	Time	Rank	MP Points	Total points	Final rank
Andrey Moiseev	Men's	175	19	1036	22–9	1	1000	1:58.88	1	1376	168	20	1032	9:51.88	11	1036	5480	1st place, gold medalist(s)
Rustem Sabirkhuzin	Men's	185	3	1156	18–13	=6	888	2:12.02	=22	1216	292	28	908	9:39.60	5	1084	5252	10
Tatiana Mouratova	Women's	174	14	1024	15–16	=16	804	2:20.22	10	1240	380	31	820	11:22.30	20	992	4880	27
Olesya Velichko	Women's	176	13	1048	14–17	=19	776	2:34.96	31	1064	140	20	1060	11:03.75	6	1068	5016	17

== Rowing ==
Russian rowers qualified the following boats:

Men

Athlete	Event	Heats		Repechage		Semifinals		Final	
Athlete	Event	Time	Rank	Time	Rank	Time	Rank	Time	Rank
Aleksandr Litvinchev; Sergey Matveyev; Vladimir Volodenkov; Yevgeny Zhigulin	Four	6:36.93	4 R	5:56.94	1 SA/B	6:02.26	5 FB	5:53.58	11
Sergey Fedorovtsev; Igor Kravtsov; Nikolay Spinyov; Aleksey Svirin	Quadruple sculls	5:43.77	2 SA/B	Bye		5:44.08	2 FA	5:56.85	1st place, gold medalist(s)
Sergey Bukreyev; Valery Sarychev; Aleksandr Savin; Aleksandr Zyuzin	Lightweight four	5:55.67	4 R	5:52.87	1 SA/B	5:59.75	4 FB	6:20.64	8

Women

Athlete	Event	Heats		Repechage		Semifinals		Final	
Athlete	Event	Time	Rank	Time	Rank	Time	Rank	Time	Rank
Irina Fedotova	Single sculls	7:51.71	2 R	7:35.83	1 SA/B	7:45.43	4 FB	7:29.04	7
Yuliya Kalinovskaya; Olga Samulenkova	Double sculls	7:54.75	5 R	7:12.02	4 FB	—N/a		7:02.25	10
Oksana Dorodnova; Yuliya Levina; Larisa Merk; Anna Sergeyeva	Quadruple sculls	6:17.72	2 R	6:23.13	1 FA	—N/a		6:36.49	4

Qualification Legend: FA=Final A (medal); FB=Final B (non-medal); FC=Final C (non-medal); FD=Final D (non-medal); FE=Final E (non-medal); FF=Final F (non-medal); SA/B=Semifinals A/B; SC/D=Semifinals C/D; SE/F=Semifinals E/F; R=Repechage

== Sailing ==
Russian sailors qualified one boat for each of the following events.

Men

Athlete	Event	Race											Net points	Final rank
Athlete	Event	1	2	3	4	5	6	7	8	9	10	M*	Net points	Final rank
Vladimir Moiseyev	Mistral	~~32~~	29	30	27	26	12	23	23	28	30	24	252	29
Vladimir Krutskikh	Finn	~~23~~	22	22	21	10	23	16	22	6	23	8	173	21
Dmitry Berezkin; Mikhail Krutikov	470	8	17	~~26~~	17	18	21	16	6	14	14	1	132	17

Women

Athlete	Event	Race											Net points	Final rank
Athlete	Event	1	2	3	4	5	6	7	8	9	10	M*	Net points	Final rank
Natalia Ivanova	Europe	17	22	23	24	~~25~~	9	24	17	21	25	22	204	25
Nataliya Gaponovich; Vlada Ilyenko	470	7	6	12	8	14	~~17~~	13	11	11	4	8	94	8
Diana Krutskikh; Tatyana Lartseva; Ekaterina Skudina	Yngling	6	5	11	~~17~~	14	4	13	1	10	12	3	79	8

Open

Athlete	Event	Race											Net points	Final rank
Athlete	Event	1	2	3	4	5	6	7	8	9	10	M*	Net points	Final rank
Maksim Semerkhanov	Laser	34	33	29	16	13	30	22	~~37~~	31	22	5	235	26
Andrey Kirilyuk; Valery Ushkov	Tornado	15	13	5	10	3	1	7	11	3	~~17~~	8	76	9

M = Medal race; OCS = On course side of the starting line; DSQ = Disqualified; DNF = Did not finish; DNS= Did not start; RDG = Redress given

== Shooting ==
Twenty-four Russian shooters (sixteen men and eight women) qualified to compete in the following events:

Men

Athlete	Event	Qualification		Final	
Athlete	Event	Points	Rank	Points	Rank
Sergey Aksyutin	Skeet	120	=15	Did not advance	
Sergei Alifirenko	25 m rapid fire pistol	592	1 Q	692.3	3rd place, bronze medalist(s)
Alexey Alipov	Trap	124 =OR	1 Q	149 =OR	1st place, gold medalist(s)
Aleksandr Blinov	10 m running target	578	5 Q	678.0	2nd place, silver medalist(s)
Vitaly Fokeev	Double trap	134 (1)	10	Did not advance	
Vladimir Isakov	10 m air pistol	584	3 Q	684.3	3rd place, bronze medalist(s)
Artem Khadjibekov	10 m air rifle	590	24	Did not advance	
Artem Khadjibekov	50 m rifle prone	594	=9	Did not advance	
Artem Khadjibekov	50 m rifle 3 positions	1164	8 Q	1261.6	5
Boris Kokorev	50 m pistol	560	8 Q	654.6	5
Maxim Kosarev	Trap	113	=25	Did not advance	
Sergei Kovalenko	50 m rifle prone	592	=16	Did not advance	
Sergei Kovalenko	50 m rifle 3 positions	1162	=9	Did not advance	
Dimitri Lykin	10 m running target	584	3 Q	677.1	3rd place, bronze medalist(s)
Vasily Mosin	Double trap	126	=19	Did not advance	
Mikhail Nestruyev	10 m air pistol	591 OR	1 Q	689.8	2nd place, silver medalist(s)
Mikhail Nestruyev	50 m pistol	565	2 Q	663.3	1st place, gold medalist(s)
Sergei Polyakov	25 m rapid fire pistol	592	2 Q	692.7	2nd place, silver medalist(s)
Konstantin Prikhodtchenko	10 m air rifle	589	=29	Did not advance	
Valeriy Shomin	Skeet	120	=15	Did not advance	

Women

Athlete	Event	Qualification		Final	
Athlete	Event	Points	Rank	Points	Rank
Galina Belyayeva	25 m pistol	566	31	Did not advance	
Svetlana Demina	Skeet	67	=9	Did not advance	
Yelena Dudnik	Double trap	105	=9	Did not advance	
Lioubov Galkina	10 m air rifle	399 OR	1 Q	501.5	2nd place, silver medalist(s)
Lioubov Galkina	50 m rifle 3 positions	587	2 Q	689.4 OR	1st place, gold medalist(s)
Tatiana Goldobina	10 m air rifle	397	5 Q	499.5	5
Tatiana Goldobina	50 m rifle 3 positions	578	=9	Did not advance	
Olga Kuznetsova	10 m air pistol	383	9	Did not advance	
Irina Laricheva	Trap	53	13	Did not advance	
Natalia Paderina	10 m air pistol	386	3 Q	481.9 (10)	5
Natalia Paderina	25 m pistol	572	23	Did not advance	

== Swimming ==
Russian swimmers earned qualifying standards in the following events (up to a maximum of 2 swimmers in each event at the A-standard time, and 1 at the B-standard time):

Men

Athlete	Event	Heat		Semifinal		Final	
Athlete	Event	Time	Rank	Time	Rank	Time	Rank
Evgeny Aleshin	100 m backstroke	55.91	19	Did not advance			
Evgeny Aleshin	200 m backstroke	2:01.25	17	Did not advance			
Igor Berezutskiy	400 m individual medley	4:23.20	21	—N/a		Did not advance	
Grigory Falko	200 m breaststroke	2:13.45	8 Q	2:12.42	9	Did not advance	
Alexey Filipets	1500 m freestyle	15:30.05	19	—N/a		Did not advance	
Andrey Kapralov	50 m freestyle	22.97	29	Did not advance			
Andrey Kapralov	100 m freestyle	49.52	9 Q	49.12	4 Q	49.30	7
Andrey Kapralov	200 m freestyle	1:49.91	16 Q	1:51.35	16	Did not advance	
Dmitry Komornikov	100 m breaststroke	1:02.05	15 Q	1:01.83	12	Did not advance	
Dmitry Komornikov	200 m breaststroke	2:14.92	17	Did not advance			
Yevgeny Korotyshkin	100 m butterfly	52.93	13 Q	52.85	10	Did not advance	
Alexey Kovrigin	400 m individual medley	4:23.77	24	—N/a		Did not advance	
Maksim Kuznetsov	200 m freestyle	1:50.93	24	Did not advance			
Igor Marchenko	100 m butterfly	52.62	9 Q	52.32	4 Q	52.32	5
Anatoly Polyakov	200 m butterfly	1:58.12	7 Q	1:57.58	9	Did not advance	
Alexander Popov	50 m freestyle	22.58	18	Did not advance			
Alexander Popov	100 m freestyle	49.51	8 Q	49.23	9	Did not advance	
Yuri Prilukov	400 m freestyle	3:48.71	6 Q	—N/a		3:46.69	6
Yuri Prilukov	1500 m freestyle	15:01.02	2 Q	—N/a		14:52.48	4
Nikolay Skvortsov	200 m butterfly	1:58.18	11 Q	1:57.37	7 Q	1:57.14	7
Roman Sloudnov	100 m breaststroke	1:01.65	10 Q	1:01.54	9	Did not advance	
Arkady Vyatchanin	100 m backstroke	55.17	7 Q	55.20	9	Did not advance	
Arkady Vyatchanin	200 m backstroke	2:01.09	14 Q	1:59.80	11	Did not advance	
Aleksey Zatsepin	200 m individual medley	2:04.11	29	Did not advance			
Andrey Kapralov; Yevgeny Lagunov; Denis Pimankov; Alexander Popov; Ivan Usov*	4 × 100 m freestyle relay	3:17.46	5 Q	—N/a		3:15.75	4
Stepan Ganzey; Maksim Kuznetsov; Yevgeniy Natsvin; Aleksey Zatsepin	4 × 200 m freestyle relay	7:23.97	11	—N/a		Did not advance	
Andrey Kapralov*; Yevgeny Korotyshkin*; Igor Marchenko; Alexander Popov; Roman Sloudnov; Arkady Vyatchanin	4 × 100 m medley relay	3:38.07	7 Q	—N/a		3:35.91	4

Women

Athlete	Event	Heat		Semifinal		Final	
Athlete	Event	Time	Rank	Time	Rank	Time	Rank
Yelena Bogomazova	100 m breaststroke	1:10.24	15 Q	1:10.41	15	Did not advance	
Yelena Bogomazova	200 m breaststroke	2:31.49	16 Q	2:30.35	12	Did not advance	
Maria Bulakhova	200 m butterfly	2:12.99	18	Did not advance			
Stanislava Komarova	100 m backstroke	1:01.84	8 Q	1:01.63	10	Did not advance	
Stanislava Komarova	200 m backstroke	2:10.71	1 Q	2:09.62	1 Q	2:09.72	2nd place, silver medalist(s)
Yana Martynova	400 m individual medley	4:52.96	21	—N/a		Did not advance	
Daria Parshina	400 m freestyle	4:18.24	25	—N/a		Did not advance	
Nataliya Shalagina	200 m freestyle	2:02.37	21	Did not advance			
Natalya Sutyagina	100 m butterfly	59.76	13 Q	59.79	16	Did not advance	
Oxana Verevka	200 m individual medley	2:16.63	13 Q	2:15.45	12	Did not advance	
Yelena Bogomazova; Nataliya Shalagina; Natalya Sutyagina; Oxana Verevka	4 × 100 m medley relay	4:10.18	12	—N/a		Did not advance	

== Synchronized swimming ==
Nine Russian synchronized swimmers qualified a spot in the women's team.

Athlete	Event	Technical routine		Free routine (preliminary)			Free routine (final)		
Athlete	Event	Points	Rank	Points	Total (technical + free)	Rank	Points	Total (technical + free)	Rank
Anastasia Davydova; Anastasiya Yermakova	Duet	49.417	1	49.584	99.001	1 Q	49.917	99.334	1st place, gold medalist(s)
Yelena Azarova; Olga Brusnikina; Anastasia Davydova; Maria Gromova; Elvira Khasyanova; Mariya Kiselyova; Olga Novokshchenova; Anna Shorina; Anastasiya Yermakova	Team	49.667	1	—N/a			49.834	99.501	1st place, gold medalist(s)

== Table tennis ==
Six Russian table tennis players qualified for the following events.

Men

Athlete	Event	Round 1	Round 2	Round 3	Round 4	Quarterfinals	Semifinals	Final / BM	
Athlete	Event	Opposition Result	Opposition Result	Opposition Result	Opposition Result	Opposition Result	Opposition Result	Opposition Result	Rank
Alexei Smirnov	Singles	Bye	Lin J (DOM); L 1–4	Did not advance					
Dmitry Mazunov; Alexei Smirnov	Doubles	—N/a	Bye	Korbel / Výborný (CZE); W 4–1	Cheung Y / Leung C Y (HKG); W 4–0	Lee C-S / Ryu S-M (KOR); W 4–1	Ko L C / Li C (HKG); L 2–4	Maze / Tugwell (DEN); L 2–4	4

Women

Athlete	Event	Round 1	Round 2	Round 3	Round 4	Quarterfinals	Semifinals	Final / BM	
Athlete	Event	Opposition Result	Opposition Result	Opposition Result	Opposition Result	Opposition Result	Opposition Result	Opposition Result	Rank
Oksana Fadeyeva	Singles	Wu X (DOM); L 1–4	Did not advance						
Svetlana Ganina	Singles	Bye	Negrisoli (ITA); W 4–2	Pavlovich (BLR); L 2–4	Did not advance				
Oksana Fadeyeva; Galina Melnik	Doubles	Bye	Edem / Offiong (NGR); W 4–3	Lau S F / Lin L (HKG); L 2–4	Did not advance				
Svetlana Ganina; Irina Palina	Doubles	Bye		Cada / Roussy (CAN); W 4–0	Song A S / Tie Y N (HKG); L 0–4	Did not advance			

== Taekwondo ==
Two Russian taekwondo jin qualified for the following events.

Athlete	Event	Round of 16	Quarterfinals	Semifinals	Repechage 1	Repechage 2	Final / BM	
Athlete	Event	Opposition Result	Opposition Result	Opposition Result	Opposition Result	Opposition Result	Opposition Result	Rank
Seyfula Magomedov	Men's −58 kg	Nguyen (VIE); L 10–12	Did not advance					
Margarita Mkrtchyan	Women's −57 kg	Abdallah (USA); L 9–16	Did not advance		Corsi (ITA); L 2–5	Did not advance		7

== Tennis ==
Russia nominated four male and five female tennis players to compete in the tournament.

Men

Athlete	Event	Round of 64	Round of 32	Round of 16	Quarterfinals	Semifinals	Final / BM	
Athlete	Event	Opposition Score	Opposition Score	Opposition Score	Opposition Score	Opposition Score	Opposition Score	Rank
Igor Andreev	Singles	Schüttler (GER); W 6–7^{(5–7)}, 7–6^{(7–2)}, 6–3	Calleri (ARG); W RET	Massú (CHI); L 3–6, 7–6^{(7–4)}, 4–6	Did not advance			
Nikolay Davydenko	Singles	Federer (SUI); L 3–6, 7–5, 1–6	Did not advance					
Marat Safin	Singles	Kučera (SVK); W 6–0, 6–4	López (ESP); L 6–7^{(4–7)}, 3–6	Did not advance				
Mikhail Youzhny	Singles	Malisse (BEL); W 6–2, 6–2	Novák (CZE); W 6–4, 6–3	Kiefer (GER); W 6–2, 3–6, 6–2	Fish (USA); L 3–6, 4–6	Did not advance		
Igor Andreev; Nikolay Davydenko	Doubles	—N/a	Chela / Zabaleta (ARG); W 3–6, 6–3, 6–4	Erlich / Ram (ISR); L 4–6, 1–6	Did not advance			
Marat Safin; Mikhail Youzhny	Doubles	—N/a	B Bryan / M Bryan (USA); L 1–6, 2–6	Did not advance				

Women

Athlete	Event	Round of 64	Round of 32	Round of 16	Quarterfinals	Semifinals	Final / BM	
Athlete	Event	Opposition Score	Opposition Score	Opposition Score	Opposition Score	Opposition Score	Opposition Score	Rank
Elena Dementieva	Singles	Molik (AUS); L 6–4, 0–6, 4–6	Did not advance					
Svetlana Kuznetsova	Singles	Díaz Oliva (ARG); W 6–3, 6–3	Morigami (JPN); W 7–6^{(7–5)}, 6–2	Schnyder (SUI); W 6–3, 6–3	Mauresmo (FRA); L 6–7^{(5–7)}, 6–4, 2–6	Did not advance		
Anastasia Myskina	Singles	Serna (ESP); W 6–0, 6–1	Brandi (PUR); W 6–3, 3–6, 6–4	Daniilidou (GRE); W 7–5, 6–4	Schiavone (ITA); W 6–1, 6–2	Henin-Hardenne (BEL); L 5–7, 7–5, 6–8	Molik (AUS); L 3–6, 4–6	4
Nadia Petrova	Singles	Suchá (SVK); W 6–3, 6–3	Pierce (FRA); L 2–6, 1–6	Did not advance				
Elena Dementieva; Anastasia Myskina	Doubles	—N/a	Asagoe / Sugiyama (JPN); L 7–5, 5–7, 3–6	Did not advance				
Svetlana Kuznetsova; Elena Likhovtseva	Doubles	—N/a	Průšová / Strýcová (CZE); W 6–2, 3–6, 6–1	Dechy / Testud (FRA); L 6–2, 6–7^{(5–7)}, 3–6	Did not advance			

== Triathlon ==
Three Russian triathletes qualified for the following events.

Athlete	Event	Swim (1.5 km)	Trans 1	Bike (40 km)	Trans 2	Run (10 km)	Total Time	Rank
Igor Sysoev	Men's	18:00	0:21	1:02:55	0:22	32:56	1:53:51.37	15
Nina Anisimova	Women's	19:41	0:22	1:16:42	0:30	Did not finish		
Olga Generalova	Women's	19:48	0:20	1:10:41	0:26	41:19	2:11:48.06	31

== Volleyball ==
=== Men's tournament ===
Roster

The following is the Russian roster in the men's volleyball tournament of the 2004 Summer Olympics.

Head coach: Gennady Shipulin

№	Name	Date of birth	Height	Weight	Spike	Block	2004 club
1	Stanislav Dineykin	10 October 1973	2.15 m (7 ft 1 in)	101 kg (223 lb)	353 cm (139 in)	342 cm (135 in)	(Italy) Sisley Volley Treviso
4	Sergei Baranov	10 August 1981	2.08 m (6 ft 10 in)	94 kg (207 lb)	355 cm (140 in)	343 cm (135 in)	(Russia) Lokomotiv Belgorod
5	Pavel Abramov	23 April 1979	1.98 m (6 ft 6 in)	89 kg (196 lb)	347 cm (137 in)	336 cm (132 in)	(Japan) Toray Arrows
7	Aleksey Kazakov	18 March 1976	2.17 m (7 ft 1 in)	102 kg (225 lb)	355 cm (140 in)	342 cm (135 in)	(Italy) Trentino Volley
8	Sergey Tetyukhin	23 September 1975	1.97 m (6 ft 6 in)	89 kg (196 lb)	345 cm (136 in)	338 cm (133 in)	(Russia) Lokomotiv Belgorod
9	Vadim Khamuttskikh (c)	26 November 1969	1.96 m (6 ft 5 in)	85 kg (187 lb)	342 cm (135 in)	331 cm (130 in)	(Russia) Lokomotiv Belgorod
10	Aleksandr Kosarev	30 September 1977	2.00 m (6 ft 7 in)	90 kg (200 lb)	339 cm (133 in)	328 cm (129 in)	(Russia) Lokomotiv Belgorod
11	Konstantin Ushakov	24 March 1970	1.98 m (6 ft 6 in)	77 kg (170 lb)	343 cm (135 in)	332 cm (131 in)	(Russia) Dynamo Moscow
12	Taras Khtey	22 May 1982	2.05 m (6 ft 9 in)	92 kg (203 lb)	345 cm (136 in)	335 cm (132 in)	(Russia) Dynamo Moscow
14	Andrey Egorchev	28 February 1978	2.05 m (6 ft 9 in)	103 kg (227 lb)	343 cm (135 in)	330 cm (130 in)	(Russia) Lokomotiv Belgorod
16	Aleksey Verbov (L)	31 January 1982	1.83 m (6 ft 0 in)	75 kg (165 lb)	315 cm (124 in)	310 cm (120 in)	(Russia) Lokomotiv Belgorod
18	Aleksey Kuleshov	24 February 1979	2.06 m (6 ft 9 in)	92 kg (203 lb)	353 cm (139 in)	340 cm (130 in)	(Russia) Lokomotiv Belgorod

Group play

Pos	Team	Pld	W	L	Pts	SW	SL	SR	SPW	SPL	SPR	Qualification
1	Brazil	5	4	1	9	13	7	1.857	483	431	1.121	Quarterfinals
2	Italy	5	3	2	8	13	7	1.857	465	434	1.071	Quarterfinals
3	United States	5	3	2	8	11	8	1.375	437	423	1.033	Quarterfinals
4	Russia	5	3	2	8	11	9	1.222	452	430	1.051	Quarterfinals
5	Netherlands	5	2	3	7	7	11	0.636	391	419	0.933	
6	Australia	5	0	5	5	2	15	0.133	331	422	0.784	

Source: FIVB

Aug 15, 2004; 11:00	Netherlands	3–2	Russia	Peace and Friendship Stadium; Attendance: 2,600; Referees: Umit Sokullu (Turkey)
Aug 15, 2004; 11:00	(25–23, 19–25, 17–25, 27–25, 18–16)			Peace and Friendship Stadium; Attendance: 2,600; Referees: Umit Sokullu (Turkey)

Aug 17, 2004; 14:00	Australia	0–3	Russia	Peace and Friendship Stadium; Attendance: 2,815; Referees: Fernando Nava (Mexico)
Aug 17, 2004; 14:00	(17–25, 24–26, 23–25)			Peace and Friendship Stadium; Attendance: 2,815; Referees: Fernando Nava (Mexico)

Aug 19, 2004; 21:45	Russia	3–1	United States	Peace and Friendship Stadium; Attendance: 4,930; Referees: Hiroyuki Ito (Japan)
Aug 19, 2004; 21:45	(22–25, 25–20, 25–16, 25–23)			Peace and Friendship Stadium; Attendance: 4,930; Referees: Hiroyuki Ito (Japan)

Aug 21, 2004; 22:20	Brazil	3–0	Russia	Peace and Friendship Stadium; Attendance: 5,400; Referees: Hiroyuki Ito (Japan)
Aug 21, 2004; 22:20	(25–19, 25–13, 25–23)			Peace and Friendship Stadium; Attendance: 5,400; Referees: Hiroyuki Ito (Japan)

Aug 23, 2004; 11:15	Russia	3–2	Italy	Peace and Friendship Stadium; Attendance: 4,134; Referees: Frank Leuthaeusser (Germany)
Aug 23, 2004; 11:15	(25–16, 25–22, 22–25, 23–25, 15–13)			Peace and Friendship Stadium; Attendance: 4,134; Referees: Frank Leuthaeusser (Germany)

Quarterfinals

Aug 25, 2004; 14:00	Serbia and Montenegro	1–3	Russia	Peace and Friendship Stadium; Attendance: 8,850; Referees: Jarmo Salonen (Finland)
Aug 25, 2004; 14:00	(27–29, 25–23, 25–27, 26–28)			Peace and Friendship Stadium; Attendance: 8,850; Referees: Jarmo Salonen (Finland)

Semifinals

Aug 27, 2004; 19:30	Russia	0–3	Italy	Peace and Friendship Stadium; Attendance: 9,380; Referees: Bela Hobor (Hungary)
Aug 27, 2004; 19:30	(16–25, 17–25, 16–25)			Peace and Friendship Stadium; Attendance: 9,380; Referees: Bela Hobor (Hungary)

Bronze medal final

Aug 29, 2004; 12:30	Russia	3–0	United States	Peace and Friendship Stadium; Attendance: 7,650; Referees: Kim Kun Tae (Korea)
Aug 29, 2004; 12:30	(25–22, 27–25, 25–16)			Peace and Friendship Stadium; Attendance: 7,650; Referees: Kim Kun Tae (Korea)

Won bronze medal

=== Women's tournament ===
Roster

The following is the Russian roster in the women's volleyball tournament of the 2004 Summer Olympics.

Head coach: Nikolay Karpol

No.	Name	Date of birth	Height	Weight	Spike	Block	2004 club
2	Irina Tebenikhina	5 December 1978	1.89 m (6 ft 2 in)	76 kg (168 lb)	308 cm (121 in)	299 cm (118 in)	(Russia) Uralochka Ekaterinburg
4	Elena Tyurina (L)	12 April 1971	1.84 m (6 ft 0 in)	82 kg (181 lb)	297 cm (117 in)	286 cm (113 in)	(Russia) Uralochka Ekaterinburg
5	Lioubov Shashkova	4 December 1977	1.92 m (6 ft 4 in)	76 kg (168 lb)	308 cm (121 in)	304 cm (120 in)	(Italy) Volley Bergamo
7	Natalya Safronova	6 February 1979	1.88 m (6 ft 2 in)	69 kg (152 lb)	300 cm (120 in)	293 cm (115 in)	(Russia) Uralochka Ekaterinburg
8	Yevgeniya Artamonova (C)	17 July 1975	1.92 m (6 ft 4 in)	76 kg (168 lb)	315 cm (124 in)	306 cm (120 in)	(Russia) Uralochka Ekaterinburg
9	Elizaveta Tishchenko	7 February 1975	1.90 m (6 ft 3 in)	75 kg (165 lb)	309 cm (122 in)	302 cm (119 in)	(Russia) Uralochka Ekaterinburg
10	Olga Chukanova	9 June 1980	1.80 m (5 ft 11 in)	76 kg (168 lb)	305 cm (120 in)	294 cm (116 in)	(Russia) Uralochka Ekaterinburg
11	Yekaterina Gamova	17 October 1980	2.04 m (6 ft 8 in)	80 kg (180 lb)	321 cm (126 in)	310 cm (120 in)	(Russia) Uralochka Ekaterinburg
12	Marina Sheshenina	26 June 1985	1.78 m (5 ft 10 in)	62 kg (137 lb)	289 cm (114 in)	277 cm (109 in)	(Russia) Uralochka Ekaterinburg
13	Alexandra Korukovets	1 October 1976	1.86 m (6 ft 1 in)	74 kg (163 lb)	305 cm (120 in)	302 cm (119 in)	(Russia) Universitet Belgorod
14	Elena Plotnikova	26 July 1978	1.85 m (6 ft 1 in)	73 kg (161 lb)	306 cm (120 in)	298 cm (117 in)	(Russia) Uralochka Ekaterinburg
16	Olga Nikolaeva	14 May 1972	1.87 m (6 ft 2 in)	74 kg (163 lb)	306 cm (120 in)	302 cm (119 in)	(Russia) Leningradka St. Petersburg

Group play

Pos	Team	Pld	W	L	Pts	SW	SL	SR	SPW	SPL	SPR	Qualification
1	China	5	4	1	9	14	4	3.500	429	346	1.240	Quarterfinals
2	Russia	5	3	2	8	11	8	1.375	426	388	1.098	Quarterfinals
3	Cuba	5	3	2	8	11	10	1.100	443	460	0.963	Quarterfinals
4	United States	5	2	3	7	11	10	1.100	472	467	1.011	Quarterfinals
5	Germany	5	2	3	7	7	11	0.636	387	414	0.935	
6	Dominican Republic	5	1	4	6	3	14	0.214	334	416	0.803	

Source: FIVB

Aug 14, 2004; 11:35	Dominican Republic	0–3	Russia	Peace and Friendship Stadium; Attendance: 1,100; Referees: Juan Angel Pereyra (Argentina)
Aug 14, 2004; 11:35	(17–25, 13–25, 16–25)			Peace and Friendship Stadium; Attendance: 1,100; Referees: Juan Angel Pereyra (Argentina)

Aug 16, 2004; 22:05	Russia	2–3	Cuba	Peace and Friendship Stadium; Attendance: 2,900; Referees: Kim Kun Tae (Korea)
Aug 16, 2004; 22:05	(24–26, 25–19, 27–25, 19–25, 13–15)			Peace and Friendship Stadium; Attendance: 2,900; Referees: Kim Kun Tae (Korea)

Aug 18, 2004; 19:30	Germany	0–3	Russia	Peace and Friendship Stadium; Attendance: 5,300; Referees: Bela Hobor (Hungary)
Aug 18, 2004; 19:30	(29–31, 11–25, 18–25)			Peace and Friendship Stadium; Attendance: 5,300; Referees: Bela Hobor (Hungary)

Aug 20, 2004; 21:30	United States	2–3	Russia	Peace and Friendship Stadium; Attendance: 4,473; Referees: Kim Kun Tae (Korea)
Aug 20, 2004; 21:30	(25–20, 17–25, 25–20, 18–25, 11–15)			Peace and Friendship Stadium; Attendance: 4,473; Referees: Kim Kun Tae (Korea)

Aug 22, 2004; 14:00	Russia	0–3	China	Peace and Friendship Stadium; Attendance: 6,320; Referees: Juan Angel Pereyra (Argentina)
Aug 22, 2004; 14:00	(15–25, 16–25, 26–28)			Peace and Friendship Stadium; Attendance: 6,320; Referees: Juan Angel Pereyra (Argentina)

Quarterfinals

Aug 24, 2004; 16:00	South Korea	0–3	Russia	Peace and Friendship Stadium; Attendance: 2,780; Referees: Fernando Nava (Mexico)
Aug 24, 2004; 16:00	(17–25, 15–25, 22–25)			Peace and Friendship Stadium; Attendance: 2,780; Referees: Fernando Nava (Mexico)

Semifinals

Aug 26, 2004; 19:30	Brazil	2–3	Russia	Peace and Friendship Stadium; Attendance: 8,150; Referees: Kim Kun Tae (Korea)
Aug 26, 2004; 19:30	(25–18, 25–21, 22–25, 26–28, 14–16)			Peace and Friendship Stadium; Attendance: 8,150; Referees: Kim Kun Tae (Korea)

Gold medal final

Aug 28, 2004; 20:10	Russia	2–3	China	Peace and Friendship Stadium; Attendance: 4,242; Referees: Juan Angel Pereyra (Argentina)
Aug 28, 2004; 20:10	(30–28, 27–25, 20–25, 23–25, 12–15)			Peace and Friendship Stadium; Attendance: 4,242; Referees: Juan Angel Pereyra (Argentina)

Won silver medal

== Water polo ==
=== Men's tournament ===
Roster

The following is the Russian roster in the men's water polo tournament of the 2004 Summer Olympics.

Head coach: Aleksandr Kabanov

№	Name	Pos.	Height	Weight	Date of birth	2004 club
1	Nikolai Maximov	GK	1.90 m (6 ft 3 in)	93 kg (205 lb)	15 November 1972	(Russia) Spartak Volgograd
2	Aleksandr Fyodorov	GK	1.95 m (6 ft 5 in)	89 kg (196 lb)	26 January 1981	(Russia) Spartak Volgograd
3	Vitaly Yurchik	CB	2.01 m (6 ft 7 in)	99 kg (218 lb)	17 May 1983	(Russia) Spartak Volgograd
4	Nikolay Kozlov	CB	1.92 m (6 ft 4 in)	92 kg (203 lb)	21 July 1972	(Russia) Spartak Volgograd
5	Roman Balashov	D	1.92 m (6 ft 4 in)	90 kg (200 lb)	9 February 1973	(Russia) Shturm 2002 Chekhov
6	Alexander Yerishev	D	1.80 m (5 ft 11 in)	82 kg (181 lb)	17 January 1973	(Russia) Dynamo Moscow
7	Revaz Tchomakhidze	CF	1.96 m (6 ft 5 in)	101 kg (223 lb)	15 December 1973	(Russia) Shturm 2002 Chekhov
8	Dmitri Stratan	D	1.96 m (6 ft 5 in)	102 kg (225 lb)	24 January 1975	(Russia) Shturm 2002 Chekhov
9	Dmitry Gorshkov (C)	D	1.80 m (5 ft 11 in)	84 kg (185 lb)	29 April 1967	(Russia) CSK VMF Moscow
10	Marat Zakirov	D	1.79 m (5 ft 10 in)	82 kg (181 lb)	8 November 1973	(Russia) Dynamo Moscow
11	Serguei Garbouzov	CB	1.92 m (6 ft 4 in)	92 kg (203 lb)	13 January 1974	(Russia) Shturm 2002 Chekhov
12	Irek Zinnourov	D	1.87 m (6 ft 2 in)	84 kg (185 lb)	11 January 1969	(Russia) Spartak Volgograd
13	Andrei Reketchinski	CF	1.90 m (6 ft 3 in)	109 kg (240 lb)	7 January 1981	(Russia) Spartak Volgograd

Group play

Pos	Team	Pld	W	D	L	GF	GA	GD	Pts	Qualification
1	Hungary	5	5	0	0	44	27	+17	10	Qualified for the semifinals
2	Serbia and Montenegro	5	4	0	1	37	26	+11	8	Qualified for the quarterfinals
3	Russia	5	3	0	2	32	28	+4	6	Qualified for the quarterfinals
4	United States	5	2	0	3	32	37	−5	4	
5	Croatia	5	1	0	4	35	41	−6	2	
6	Kazakhstan	5	0	0	5	21	42	−21	0	

15 August 2004; 16:30	Russia	5–2	Kazakhstan	Athens Olympic Aquatic Centre; Referees: Koratochvil (SVK), Koryzna (POL)
15 August 2004; 16:30	Score by quarters: 0-0, 1-0, 2-1, 2-1			Athens Olympic Aquatic Centre; Referees: Koratochvil (SVK), Koryzna (POL)
15 August 2004; 16:30	Chomakhidze, Gorshkov 2	Goals	2 players with 1	Athens Olympic Aquatic Centre; Referees: Koratochvil (SVK), Koryzna (POL)

17 August 2004; 17:45	Russia	3–4	Serbia and Montenegro	Athens Olympic Aquatic Centre; Referees: Tulga (TUR), Petronilli (ITA)
17 August 2004; 17:45	Score by quarters: 1-1, 1-1, 0-1, 1-1			Athens Olympic Aquatic Centre; Referees: Tulga (TUR), Petronilli (ITA)
17 August 2004; 17:45	3 players with 1	Goals	Trbojević 2	Athens Olympic Aquatic Centre; Referees: Tulga (TUR), Petronilli (ITA)

19 August 2004; 22:15	Croatia	8–9	Russia	Athens Olympic Aquatic Centre; Referees: Stavropoulos (GRE), Kratochvil (SVK)
19 August 2004; 22:15	Score by quarters: 2-2, 2-3, 1-1, 3-3			Athens Olympic Aquatic Centre; Referees: Stavropoulos (GRE), Kratochvil (SVK)
19 August 2004; 22:15	Franković, Fatović 2	Goals	Zinnourov 2	Athens Olympic Aquatic Centre; Referees: Stavropoulos (GRE), Kratochvil (SVK)

21 August 2004; 22:15	Russia	9–7	United States	Athens Olympic Aquatic Centre; Referees: Borrell (ESP), Bock (GER)
21 August 2004; 22:15	Score by quarters: 3-1, 3-3, 2-0, 1-3			Athens Olympic Aquatic Centre; Referees: Borrell (ESP), Bock (GER)
21 August 2004; 22:15	Eryshov, Chomakhidze 3	Goals	Beaubien, Azevedo 2	Athens Olympic Aquatic Centre; Referees: Borrell (ESP), Bock (GER)

23 August 2004; 18:15	Russia	6–7	Hungary	Athens Olympic Aquatic Centre; Referees: Margeta (SLO), Stavropoulos (GRE)
23 August 2004; 18:15	Score by quarters: 1-2, 1-1, 1-3, 3-1			Athens Olympic Aquatic Centre; Referees: Margeta (SLO), Stavropoulos (GRE)
23 August 2004; 18:15	Eryshov, Garbuzov 2	Goals	Kiss 2	Athens Olympic Aquatic Centre; Referees: Margeta (SLO), Stavropoulos (GRE)

Quarterfinals

25 August 2004; 17:00	Russia	12–5	Germany	Athens Olympic Aquatic Centre; Referees: Petronilli (ITA), Bookelman (NED)
25 August 2004; 17:00	Score by quarters: 2-1, 2-1, 5-0, 3-3			Athens Olympic Aquatic Centre; Referees: Petronilli (ITA), Bookelman (NED)
25 August 2004; 17:00	3 players with 3	Goals	5 players with 1	Athens Olympic Aquatic Centre; Referees: Petronilli (ITA), Bookelman (NED)

Semifinals

27 August 2004; 18:15	Hungary	7–5	Russia	Athens Olympic Aquatic Centre; Referees: Chaney (USA), Bock (GER)
27 August 2004; 18:15	Score by quarters: 2-2, 3-3, 2-0, 0-0			Athens Olympic Aquatic Centre; Referees: Chaney (USA), Bock (GER)
27 August 2004; 18:15	Kásás 3	Goals	Garbuzov 2	Athens Olympic Aquatic Centre; Referees: Chaney (USA), Bock (GER)

Bronze medal final

29 August 2004; 16:00	Russia	6–5	Greece	Olympic Aquatic Centre; Referees: Borrell (ESP), Brguljan (SCG)
29 August 2004; 16:00	Score by quarters: 1-1, 3–1, 1–2, 1–1			Olympic Aquatic Centre; Referees: Borrell (ESP), Brguljan (SCG)
29 August 2004; 16:00	Tchomakhidze 4	Goals	Afroudakis 3	Olympic Aquatic Centre; Referees: Borrell (ESP), Brguljan (SCG)

Won bronze medal

=== Women's tournament ===
Roster

The following is the Russian roster in the men's water polo tournament of the 2004 Summer Olympics.

Head coach: Alexander Kleymenov

№	Name	Pos.	Height	Weight	Date of birth	2004 club
1	Valentina Vorontsova	GK	1.79 m (5 ft 10 in)	66 kg (146 lb)	26 July 1982	(Russia) SKIF-CSP Izmailovo
2	Natalia Shepelina	D	1.69 m (5 ft 7 in)	61 kg (134 lb)	24 February 1981	(Russia) Uralochka Zlatoust
3	Ekaterina Salimova	CB	1.77 m (5 ft 10 in)	70 kg (150 lb)	2 April 1982	(Russia) Uralochka Zlatoust
4	Sofia Konukh (C)	CB	1.82 m (6 ft 0 in)	72 kg (159 lb)	9 March 1980	(Russia) Kinef Kirishi
5	Elena Smurova	CF	1.78 m (5 ft 10 in)	72 kg (159 lb)	18 January 1974	(Russia) Diana Saint Petersburg
6	Galina Zlotnikova	GK	1.76 m (5 ft 9 in)	74 kg (163 lb)	24 April 1984	(Russia) Kinef Kirishi
7	Anastasia Zubkova	CB	1.73 m (5 ft 8 in)	66 kg (146 lb)	3 February 1980	(Russia) Uralochka Zlatoust
8	Svetlana Bogdanova	D	1.67 m (5 ft 6 in)	65 kg (143 lb)	3 October 1976	(Russia) Kinef Kirishi
9	Tatiana Petrova	D	1.62 m (5 ft 4 in)	63 kg (139 lb)	22 May 1973	(Russia) Uralochka Zlatoust
10	Olga Turova	CF	1.82 m (6 ft 0 in)	81 kg (179 lb)	13 March 1983	(Russia) Kinef Kirishi
11	Ekaterina Shishova	CB	1.72 m (5 ft 8 in)	59 kg (130 lb)	13 September 1978	(Russia) Uralochka Zlatoust
12	Ekaterina Vasilieva	D	1.73 m (5 ft 8 in)	68 kg (150 lb)	30 May 1976	(Russia) SKIF-CSP Izmailovo
13	Maria Yaina	D	1.74 m (5 ft 9 in)	62 kg (137 lb)	25 January 1982	(Russia) SKIF-CSP Izmailovo

Group play

Pos	Team	Pld	W	D	L	GF	GA	GD	Pts	Qualification
1	United States	3	2	0	1	20	16	+4	4	Qualified for the Semifinals
2	Russia	3	2	0	1	21	22	−1	4	Qualified for the Quarterfinals
3	Hungary	3	1	0	2	19	20	−1	2	Qualified for the Quarterfinals
4	Canada	3	1	0	2	16	18	−2	2	

16 August 2004; 16:30	Report	Russia	8–6	Canada	Athens Olympic Aquatic Centre; Referees: Erhan Tulga (TUR); Torsten Bock (GER)
16 August 2004; 16:30	Report	Score by quarters: 1–2, 3–0, 2–3, 2–1			Athens Olympic Aquatic Centre; Referees: Erhan Tulga (TUR); Torsten Bock (GER)
16 August 2004; 16:30	Report	Konukh 3 Yaina 2 Salimova 1 Smurova 1 Turova 1	Goals	Gardiner 2 Arpin 1 Bégin 1 Dow 1 Robinson 1	Athens Olympic Aquatic Centre; Referees: Erhan Tulga (TUR); Torsten Bock (GER)

18 August 2004; 16:30	Report	Russia	9–8	Hungary	Athens Olympic Aquatic Centre; Referees: Peter Bookelman (NED); Torsten Bock (GER)
18 August 2004; 16:30	Report	Score by quarters: 2–1, 3–3, 2–3, 2–1			Athens Olympic Aquatic Centre; Referees: Peter Bookelman (NED); Torsten Bock (GER)
18 August 2004; 16:30	Report	Konukh 3 Salimova 3 Turova 3	Goals	Kisteleki 2 Primász 2 Stieber 2 Dravucz 1 Pelle 1	Athens Olympic Aquatic Centre; Referees: Peter Bookelman (NED); Torsten Bock (GER)

20 August 2004; 10:15	Report	United States	8–4	Russia	Athens Olympic Aquatic Centre; Referees: Sergio Borrell (ESP]); Boris Margeta (SLO)
20 August 2004; 10:15	Report	Score by quarters: 1–1, 4–1, 2–1, 1–1			Athens Olympic Aquatic Centre; Referees: Sergio Borrell (ESP]); Boris Margeta (SLO)
20 August 2004; 10:15	Report	Beauregard 2 Villa 2 Dingeldein 1 Lorenz 1 Stachowski 1 Rulon 1	Goals	Salimova 1 Shepelina 1 Turova 1 Yaina 1	Athens Olympic Aquatic Centre; Referees: Sergio Borrell (ESP]); Boris Margeta (SLO)

Quarterfinals

22 August 2004; 17:00	Report	Greece	7–4	Russia	Athens Olympic Aquatic Centre; Referees: Zoran Tomić (CRO); Mario Brguljan (SCG)
22 August 2004; 17:00	Report	Score by quarters: 2–1, 3–0, 2–1, 0–2			Athens Olympic Aquatic Centre; Referees: Zoran Tomić (CRO); Mario Brguljan (SCG)
22 August 2004; 17:00	Report	Liosi 2 Roumpesi 2 Asilian 1 Karagianni 1 Oikonomopoulou 1	Goals	Konukh 1 Salimova 1 Smurova 1 Yaina 1	Athens Olympic Aquatic Centre; Referees: Zoran Tomić (CRO); Mario Brguljan (SCG)

Classification 5th–6th

24 August 2004; 10:45	Report	Russia	12–11 (OT)	Hungary	Athens Olympic Aquatic Centre; Referees: Daniel Legare (CAN); Noel Harrod (AUS)
24 August 2004; 10:45	Report	Score by quarters: 3–5, 1–2, 4–0, 2–3 OT: 1–0, 1–1			Athens Olympic Aquatic Centre; Referees: Daniel Legare (CAN); Noel Harrod (AUS)
24 August 2004; 10:45	Report	Salimova 4 Konukh 2 Yaina 2 Bogdanova 1 Smurova 1 Turova 1 Vasilieva 1	Goals	Dravucz 3 Stieber 3 Kisteleki 2 Györe 1 Pelle 1 Szremkó 1	Athens Olympic Aquatic Centre; Referees: Daniel Legare (CAN); Noel Harrod (AUS)

== Weightlifting ==
Nine Russian weightlifters qualified for the following events:

Men

Athlete	Event	Snatch		Clean & Jerk		Total	Rank
Athlete	Event	Result	Rank	Result	Rank	Total	Rank
Oleg Perepetchenov	−77 kg	170	3	195	10	~~365~~	DSQ*
Zaur Takhushev	−85 kg	~~175~~	DNF	—	—	—	DNF
Khadzhimurat Akkayev	−94 kg	185	2	220	4	405	2nd place, silver medalist(s)
Eduard Tyukin	−94 kg	182.5	3	215	5	397.5	3rd place, bronze medalist(s)
Dmitry Berestov	−105 kg	195 OR	1	230	2	425	1st place, gold medalist(s)
Gleb Pisarevskiy	−105 kg	190	4	225	3	415	3rd place, bronze medalist(s)

* Oleg Perepetchenov originally claimed the bronze medal but was disqualified after testing positive for an anabolic steroid.

Women

Athlete	Event	Snatch		Clean & Jerk		Total	Rank
Athlete	Event	Result	Rank	Result	Rank	Total	Rank
Zarema Kasaeva	−69 kg	117.5	3	145	3	262.5	3rd place, bronze medalist(s)
Natalia Zabolotnaya	−75 kg	125 WR	1	147.5	2	272.5	2nd place, silver medalist(s)
Valentina Popova	−75 kg	120	3	145	3	265	3rd place, bronze medalist(s)

== Wrestling ==
Key:

- VT - Victory by Fall.
- PP - Decision by Points - the loser with technical points.
- PO - Decision by Points - the loser without technical points.

Men's freestyle

Athlete	Event	Elimination Pool				Quarterfinal	Semifinal	Final / BM	
Athlete	Event	Opposition Result	Opposition Result	Opposition Result	Rank	Opposition Result	Opposition Result	Opposition Result	Rank
Mavlet Batirov	−55 kg	Mansurov (UZB); W 3–1 ^{PP}	Rahmati (AFG); W 4–0 ^{ST}	—N/a	1 Q	Zakharuk (UKR); W 3–0 ^{PO}	Kardanov (GRE); W 3–1 ^{PP}	Abas (USA); W 3–1 ^{PP}	1st place, gold medalist(s)
Murad Umakhanov	−60 kg	Odabaşı (TUR); W 3–1 ^{PP}	Sissaouri (CAN); L 1–3 ^{PP}	—N/a	2	Did not advance			10
Makhach Murtazaliev	−66 kg	Dabir (IRI); W 3–1 ^{PP}	Tavkazakhov (UZB); W 3–1 ^{PP}	—N/a	1 Q	Çubukçu (TUR); W 3–0 ^{PO}	Kelly (USA); L 1–3 ^{PP}	Spiridonov (KAZ); W 3–1 ^{PP}	3rd place, bronze medalist(s)
Buvaisar Saitiev	−74 kg	Ritter (HUN); W 3–1 ^{PP}	Bentinidis (GRE); W 3–1 ^{PP}	—N/a	1 Q	Haidarau (BLR); W 3–1 ^{PP}	Brzozowski (POL); W 3–0 ^{PO}	Laliyev (KAZ); W 3–0 ^{PO}	1st place, gold medalist(s)
Sazhid Sazhidov	−84 kg	Sène (SEN); W 4–0 ^{ST}	Ghiță (ROM); W 5–0 ^{VT}	Aliev (TJK); W 3–0 ^{PO}	1 Q	Bye	Moon E-J (KOR); L 1–3 ^{PP}	Romero (CUB); W 3–1 ^{PP}	3rd place, bronze medalist(s)
Khadzhimurat Gatsalov	−96 kg	Scherrer (SUI); W 3–1 ^{PP}	Tasoyev (UKR); W 3–0 ^{PO}	—N/a	1 Q	Shemarov (BLR); W 3–0 ^{PO}	Cormier (USA); W 3–1 ^{PP}	Ibragimov (UZB); W 3–1 ^{PP}	1st place, gold medalist(s)
Kuramagomed Kuramagomedov	−120 kg	Aubéli (HUN); W 3–0 ^{PO}	Modebadze (GEO); W 3–0 ^{PO}	—N/a	1 Q	Taymazov (UZB); L 1–3 ^{PP}	Did not advance	Rodríguez (CUB); L 0–3 ^{PO}	6

Men's Greco-Roman

Athlete	Event	Elimination Pool				Quarterfinal	Semifinal	Final / BM	
Athlete	Event	Opposition Result	Opposition Result	Opposition Result	Rank	Opposition Result	Opposition Result	Opposition Result	Rank
Geidar Mamedaliyev	−55 kg	Khatri (IND); W 3–0 ^{PO}	Jabłoński (POL); W 3–0 ^{PO}	—N/a	1 Q	Im D-W (KOR); W 3–0 ^{PO}	Kiouregkian (GRE); W 3–1 ^{PP}	Majoros (HUN); L 1–3 ^{PP}	2nd place, silver medalist(s)
Aleksey Shevtsov	−60 kg	Ailinuer (CHN); W 3–1 ^{PP}	Kohl (GER); W 3–0 ^{PO}	—N/a	1 Q	Koizhaiganov (KAZ); W 3–1 ^{PP}	Monzón (CUB); L 1–3 ^{PP}	Nazaryan (BUL); L 1–3 ^{PP}	4
Maksim Semenov	−66 kg	Galstyan (ARM); L 1–3 ^{PP}	Samuelsson (SWE); W 3–1 ^{PP}	—N/a	2	Did not advance			9
Varteres Samurgashev	−74 kg	Shatskykh (UKR); W 3–0 ^{PO}	Babulfath (SWE); W 3–0 ^{PO}	Schneider (GER); W 3–1 ^{PP}	1 Q	Bye	Dokturishvili (UZB); L 1–3 ^{PP}	Bucher (SUI); W 4–0 ^{ST}	3rd place, bronze medalist(s)
Alexei Mishin	−84 kg	Tsitsiashvili (ISR); W 3–0 ^{PO}	Noumonvi (FRA); W 3–0 ^{PO}	—N/a	1 Q	Avramis (GRE); W 3–1 ^{PP}	Makaranka (BLR); W 3–0 ^{PO}	Abrahamian (SWE); W 3–1 ^{PP}	1st place, gold medalist(s)
Gogi Koguashvili	−96 kg	Lidberg (SWE); W 3–1 ^{PP}	Lishtvan (BLR); W 3–0 ^{PO}	—N/a	1 Q	Nozadze (GEO); L 0–3 ^{PO}	Did not advance		6
Khasan Baroev	−120 kg	Vála (CZE); W 3–0 ^{PO}	Chekhauskoi (BLR); W 3–0 ^{PO}	—N/a	1 Q	López (CUB); W 3–0 ^{PO}	Barzi (IRI); W 3–0 ^{PO}	Tsurtsumia (KAZ); W 3–1 ^{PP}	1st place, gold medalist(s)

Women's freestyle

Athlete	Event	Elimination Pool				Classification	Semifinal	Final / BM	
Athlete	Event	Opposition Result	Opposition Result	Opposition Result	Rank	Opposition Result	Opposition Result	Opposition Result	Rank
Lorisa Oorzhak	−48 kg	Caripá (VEN); W 3–0 ^{PO}	Miranda (USA); L 1–3 ^{PP}	Li H (CHN); W 3–1 ^{PP}	2	Karamchakova (TJK); W 4–0 ^{ST}	Bye	Wagner (GER); W 3–1 ^{PP}	5
Olga Smirnova	−55 kg	O'Donnell (USA); L 0–5 ^{VT}	Verbeek (CAN); L 1–4 ^{SP}	—N/a	3	Did not advance			9
Alena Kartashova	−63 kg	Holovchenko (UKR); W 3–0 ^{PO}	K Icho (JPN); L 0–3 ^{PO}	—N/a	2	Khilko (BLR); L 1–3 ^{PP}	Did not advance		8
Guzel Manyurova	−72 kg	Gastl (AUT); W 3–1 ^{PP}	Schätzle (GER); W 5–0 ^{VT}	—N/a	1 Q	Bye	Saenko (UKR); W 4–0 ^{ST}	Wang X (CHN); L 1–3 ^{PP}	2nd place, silver medalist(s)

== Doping disqualifications ==
Originally, Russia recorded an overall tally of 92 medals at these Olympic Games. On 23 August 2004, the International Olympic Committee ordered a lifetime ban for shot putter Irina Korzhanenko and stripped her of her gold medal after she tested positive for the steroid stanozolol. Eight years later, her teammate Svetlana Krivelyova was ordered to hand back her bronze, as the drug re-testings of her samples were positive.

== See also ==
- Russia at the 2004 Summer Paralympics
