= Volleyball at the 2004 Summer Olympics – Women's tournament =

Women's volleyball at the Games of the XXVIII Olympiad
- Venue: Peace and Friendship Stadium
- Date: 14–28 August
- Competitors: 144 from 12 nations

Medalists
1st place, gold medalist(s)		China (2nd title)
2nd place, silver medalist(s)		Russia
3rd place, bronze medalist(s)		Cuba

The women's tournament in volleyball at the 2004 Summer Olympics was the eleventh edition of the event, organised by the world's governing body, the FIVB in conjunction with the International Olympic Committee. It was held at the Peace and Friendship Stadium located at the Faliro Coastal Zone Olympic Complex between 14 and 28 August 2004.

The medals for the competition were presented by Henri Sérandour, France; Timothy Fok Tsun-ting, Hong Kong; and Els van Breda Vriesman, Netherlands; IOC Members, and the medalists' bouquets were presented by Jizhong Wei, People's Republic of China; FIVB 1st Vice-President, Cristobal Marte Hoffiz, Dominican Republic; FIVB Vice President, and Aleksandar Boričić, Serbia and Montenegro; FIVB Board-Administration Member.

== Competition schedule ==
P	Preliminary round	¼	Quarterfinals	½	Semifinals	B	Bronze medal match	F	Final

Sat 14	Sun 15	Mon 16	Tue 17	Wed 18	Thu 19	Fri 20	Sat 21	Sun 22	Mon 23	Tue 24	Wed 25	Thu 26	Fri 27	Sat 28	
P		P		P		P		P		¼		½		B	F

== Qualification ==
Qualifiers	Date	Host	Vacancies	Qualified
Host country	5 September 1997	(Switzerland) Lausanne	1	Greece
2003 Women's World Cup	1–15 November 2003	Japan	3	China
2003 Women's World Cup	1–15 November 2003	Japan	3	Brazil
2003 Women's World Cup	1–15 November 2003	Japan	3	United States
European Qualification	5–10 January 2004	Baku, Azerbaijan	1	Germany
North American Qualification	15–21 December 2003	Santo Domingo, Dominican Republic	1	Cuba
South American Qualification	9–11 January 2004	Caracas, Venezuela	1	Dominican Republic*
African Qualification	7–10 January 2004	Nairobi, Kenya	1	Kenya
Asian Qualification	8–16 May 2004	Tokyo, Japan	1	South Korea
2004 Olympic Qualification Tournament	8–16 May 2004	Tokyo, Japan	3	Japan
2004 Olympic Qualification Tournament	8–16 May 2004	Tokyo, Japan	3	Russia
2004 Olympic Qualification Tournament	8–16 May 2004	Tokyo, Japan	3	Italy
Total			12	Source:FIVB

* Dominican Republic is associated at the NORCECA (North America and Caribbean), but entered the South American Qualification as only three South American countries competed at the continental qualification. The country won a wildcard after win the gold medal at the 2003 Pan American Games.

== Format ==
The tournament was played in two different stages. In the Preliminary round (first stage), the twelve participants were divided into two pools of six teams. A single round-robin format was played within each pool to determine the teams position in the pool. The four highest ranked teams in each pool advanced to the Final round (second stage) and the two lowest ranked teams took no further participation (with pool places 5th and 6th being ranked in the final standings as joined 9th and 11th, respectively).

The Final round was played in a single elimination format, starting at the quarterfinals, winners advanced to the semifinals while losers were eliminated (ranked at standings as joined 5th).

== Pools composition ==
Teams were seeded following the Serpentine system according to their ranking as of January 2004.

Pool A	Pool B
Greece (hosts)	Cuba (1st)
Brazil (3rd)	China (2nd)
Italy (4th)	Dominican Republic
Japan	Germany
Kenya	Russia
South Korea	United States

== Venue ==
All matches
, Piraeus, Greece
Peace and Friendship Stadium
Capacity: 10,520
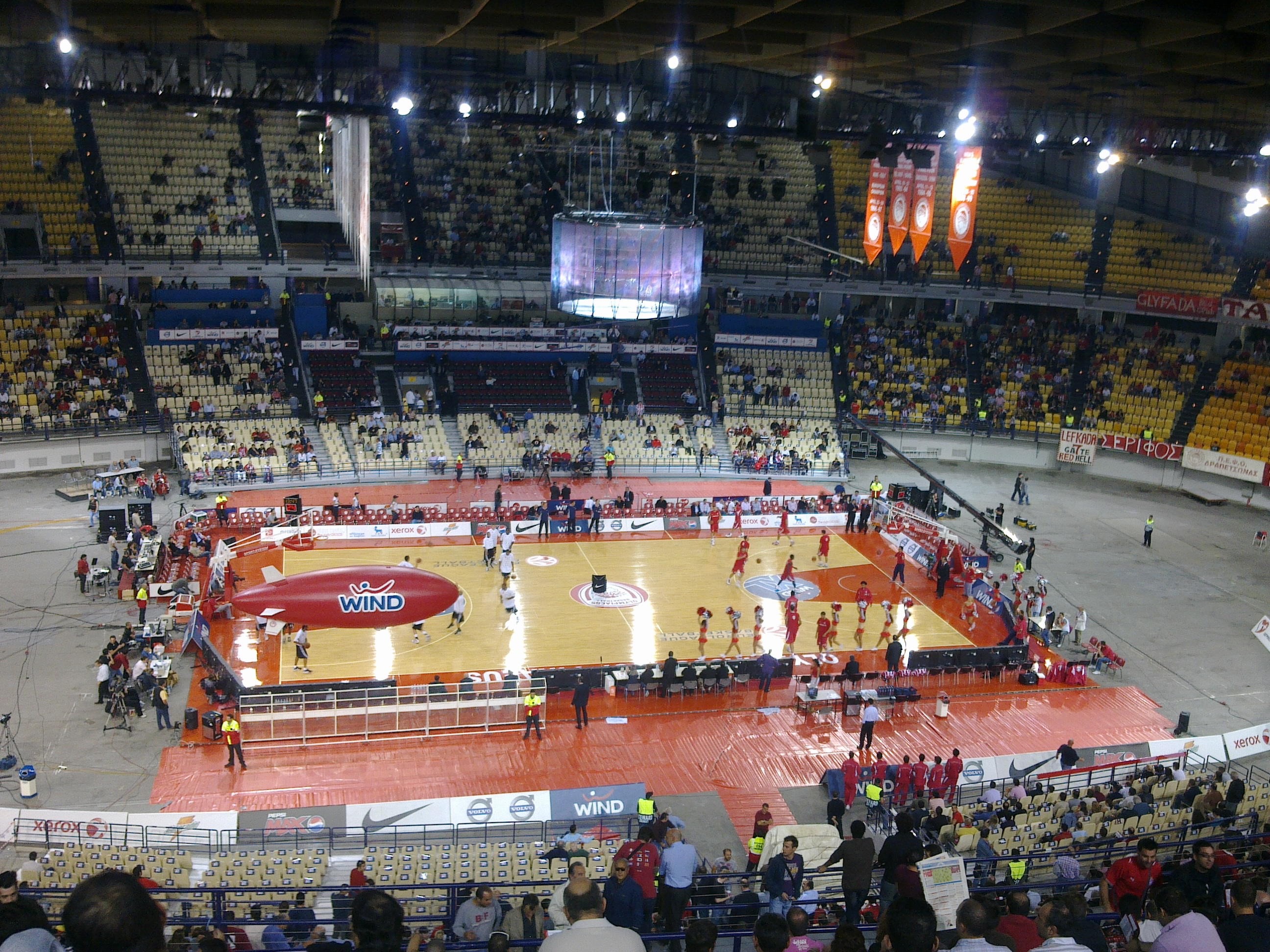

== Preliminary round ==
- All times are Eastern European Summer Time (UTC+3:00).

=== Pool A ===
Pos	Team	Pld	W	L	Pts	SW	SL	SR	SPW	SPL	SPR	Qualification
1	Brazil	5	5	0	10	15	2	7.500	410	326	1.258	Quarterfinals
2	Italy	5	4	1	9	14	3	4.667	392	305	1.285	Quarterfinals
3	South Korea	5	3	2	8	9	7	1.286	355	352	1.009	Quarterfinals
4	Japan	5	2	3	7	6	10	0.600	346	343	1.009	Quarterfinals
5	Greece	5	1	4	6	5	12	0.417	349	383	0.911	
6	Kenya	5	0	5	5	0	15	0.000	236	379	0.623	

Source: FIVB

14 August 2004; 14:00	Japan	0–3	Brazil	Peace and Friendship Stadium
14 August 2004; 14:00	(21–25, 22–25, 21–25); Report			Peace and Friendship Stadium

14 August 2004; 16:00	Greece	3–0	Kenya	Peace and Friendship Stadium
14 August 2004; 16:00	(25–7, 25–22, 25–14); Report			Peace and Friendship Stadium

14 August 2004; 19:30	South Korea	0–3	Italy	Peace and Friendship Stadium
14 August 2004; 19:30	(17–25, 13–25, 19–25); Report			Peace and Friendship Stadium

16 August 2004; 9:00	Kenya	0–3	Brazil	Peace and Friendship Stadium
16 August 2004; 9:00	(16–25, 27–29, 12–25); Report			Peace and Friendship Stadium

16 August 2004; 14:00	Italy	3–0	Japan	Peace and Friendship Stadium
16 August 2004; 14:00	(25–16, 25–13, 25–17); Report			Peace and Friendship Stadium

16 August 2004; 16:00	Greece	1–3	South Korea	Peace and Friendship Stadium
16 August 2004; 16:00	(25–20, 19–25, 15–25, 22–25); Report			Peace and Friendship Stadium

18 August 2004; 11:50	South Korea	3–0	Kenya	Peace and Friendship Stadium
18 August 2004; 11:50	(25–16, 25–20, 25–19); Report			Peace and Friendship Stadium

18 August 2004; 16:35	Japan	3–1	Greece	Peace and Friendship Stadium
18 August 2004; 16:35	(25–10, 20–25, 25–21, 25–22); Report			Peace and Friendship Stadium

18 August 2004; 21:30	Brazil	3–2	Italy	Peace and Friendship Stadium
18 August 2004; 21:30	(19–25, 25–13, 22–25, 25–16, 15–13); Report			Peace and Friendship Stadium

20 August 2004; 14:00	South Korea	3–0	Japan	Peace and Friendship Stadium
20 August 2004; 14:00	(25–21, 26–24, 25–21); Report			Peace and Friendship Stadium

20 August 2004; 16:00	Greece	0–3	Brazil	Peace and Friendship Stadium
20 August 2004; 16:00	(22–25, 22–25, 11–25); Report			Peace and Friendship Stadium

20 August 2004; 19:30	Kenya	0–3	Italy	Peace and Friendship Stadium
20 August 2004; 19:30	(17–25, 13–25, 14–25); Report			Peace and Friendship Stadium

22 August 2004; 11:00	Japan	3–0	Kenya	Peace and Friendship Stadium
22 August 2004; 11:00	(25–8, 25–17, 25–14); Report			Peace and Friendship Stadium

22 August 2004; 16:00	Italy	3–0	Greece	Peace and Friendship Stadium
22 August 2004; 16:00	(25–19 ,25–19, 25–22); Report			Peace and Friendship Stadium

22 August 2004; 19:30	Brazil	3–0	South Korea	Peace and Friendship Stadium
22 August 2004; 19:30	(25–19, 25–18, 25–23); Report			Peace and Friendship Stadium

=== Pool B ===
Pos	Team	Pld	W	L	Pts	SW	SL	SR	SPW	SPL	SPR	Qualification
1	China	5	4	1	9	14	4	3.500	429	346	1.240	Quarterfinals
2	Russia	5	3	2	8	11	8	1.375	426	388	1.098	Quarterfinals
3	Cuba	5	3	2	8	11	10	1.100	443	460	0.963	Quarterfinals
4	United States	5	2	3	7	11	10	1.100	472	467	1.011	Quarterfinals
5	Germany	5	2	3	7	7	11	0.636	387	414	0.935	
6	Dominican Republic	5	1	4	6	3	14	0.214	334	416	0.803	

Source: FIVB

14 August 2004; 9:00	Cuba	2–3	Germany	Peace and Friendship Stadium
14 August 2004; 9:00	(25–20, 26–24, 22–25, 15–25, 15–17); Report			Peace and Friendship Stadium

14 August 2004; 11:35	Dominican Republic	0–3	Russia	Peace and Friendship Stadium
14 August 2004; 11:35	(17–25, 13–25, 16–25); Report			Peace and Friendship Stadium

14 August 2004; 21:30	China	3–1	United States	Peace and Friendship Stadium
14 August 2004; 21:30	(25–21, 23–25, 25–22, 25–18); Report			Peace and Friendship Stadium

16 August 2004; 11:00	China	3–0	Dominican Republic	Peace and Friendship Stadium
16 August 2004; 11:00	(25–20, 25–16, 25–16); Report			Peace and Friendship Stadium

16 August 2004; 19:30	United States	3–1	Germany	Peace and Friendship Stadium
16 August 2004; 19:30	(25–22, 25–22, 22–25, 27–25); Report			Peace and Friendship Stadium

16 August 2004; 22:05	Russia	2–3	Cuba	Peace and Friendship Stadium
16 August 2004; 22:05	(24–26, 25–19, 27–25, 19–25, 13–15); Report			Peace and Friendship Stadium

18 August 2004; 9:00	Dominican Republic	3–2	United States	Peace and Friendship Stadium
18 August 2004; 9:00	(26–24, 22–25, 27–25, 23–25, 19–17); Report			Peace and Friendship Stadium

18 August 2004; 14:00	Cuba	3–2	China	Peace and Friendship Stadium
18 August 2004; 14:00	(25–19, 22–25, 15–25, 25–21, 15–13); Report			Peace and Friendship Stadium

18 August 2004; 19:30	Germany	0–3	Russia	Peace and Friendship Stadium
18 August 2004; 19:30	(29–31 ,11–25, 18–25); Report			Peace and Friendship Stadium

20 August 2004; 9:00	China	3–0	Germany	Peace and Friendship Stadium
20 August 2004; 9:00	(25–18, 25–15, 25–16); Report			Peace and Friendship Stadium

20 August 2004; 11:00	Dominican Republic	0–3	Cuba	Peace and Friendship Stadium
20 August 2004; 11:00	(23–25, 17–25, 23–25); Report			Peace and Friendship Stadium

20 August 2004; 21:30	United States	2–3	Russia	Peace and Friendship Stadium
20 August 2004; 21:30	(25–20, 17–25, 25–20, 18–25, 11–15); Report			Peace and Friendship Stadium

22 August 2004; 9:00	Germany	3–0	Dominican Republic	Peace and Friendship Stadium
22 August 2004; 9:00	(25–16, 25–19, 25–21); Report			Peace and Friendship Stadium

22 August 2004; 14:00	Russia	0–3	China	Peace and Friendship Stadium
22 August 2004; 14:00	(15–25, 16–25, 26–28); Report			Peace and Friendship Stadium

22 August 2004; 21:30	Cuba	0–3	United States	Peace and Friendship Stadium
22 August 2004; 21:30	(22–25, 12–25, 19–25); Report			Peace and Friendship Stadium

== Final round ==
Quarter-finals
24 August
Brazil	3
United States	2
24 August
South Korea	0
Russia	3
24 August
Italy	2
Cuba	3
24 August
Japan	0
China	3

Semi-finals
26 August
Brazil	2
Russia	3
26 August
Cuba	2
China	3

Final
28 August
China	3
Russia	2
Bronze medal match
28 August
Cuba	3
Brazil	1

=== Quarterfinals ===
24 August 2004; 14:00	Japan	0–3	China	Peace and Friendship Stadium
24 August 2004; 14:00	(20–25, 22–25, 20–25); Report			Peace and Friendship Stadium

24 August 2004; 16:00	South Korea	0–3	Russia	Peace and Friendship Stadium
24 August 2004; 16:00	(17–25, 15–25, 22–25); Report			Peace and Friendship Stadium

24 August 2004; 19:30	Italy	2–3	Cuba	Peace and Friendship Stadium
24 August 2004; 19:30	(23–25, 25–14, 25–22, 14–25, 12–15); Report			Peace and Friendship Stadium

24 August 2004; 21:55	Brazil	3–2	United States	Peace and Friendship Stadium
24 August 2004; 21:55	(25–22, 25–20, 22–25, 25–27, 15–6); Report			Peace and Friendship Stadium

=== Semifinals ===
26 August 2004; 19:30	Brazil	2–3	Russia	Peace and Friendship Stadium
26 August 2004; 19:30	(25–18, 25–21, 22–25, 26–28, 14–16); Report			Peace and Friendship Stadium

26 August 2004; 22:15	Cuba	2–3	China	Peace and Friendship Stadium
26 August 2004; 22:15	(22–25, 20–25, 25–17, 25–23, 10–15); Report			Peace and Friendship Stadium

=== Bronze medal match ===
28 August 2004; 18:00	Brazil	1–3	Cuba	Peace and Friendship Stadium
28 August 2004; 18:00	(22–25, 22–25, 25–14, 17–25); Report			Peace and Friendship Stadium

=== Gold medal match ===
28 August 2004; 20:10	Russia	2–3	China	Peace and Friendship Stadium
28 August 2004; 20:10	(30–28, 27–25, 20–25, 23–25, 12–15); Report			Peace and Friendship Stadium

== Final standings ==
Place	Team
1st place, gold medalist(s)	China
2nd place, silver medalist(s)	Russia
3rd place, bronze medalist(s)	Cuba
4	Brazil
5	Italy
5	Japan
5	South Korea
5	United States
9	Germany
9	Greece
11	Dominican Republic
11	Kenya

2004 Women's Olympic champions

China
2nd title

12-woman roster
Feng Kun (c), Yang Hao, Liu Yanan, Li Shan, Zhou Suhong, Zhao Ruirui, Zhang Yuehong, Chen Jing, Song Nina, Wang Lina, Zhang Na (L), Zhang Ping
Head coach
Chen Zhonghe

== Medalists ==
Gold	Silver	Bronze
China Feng Kun (c); Yang Hao; Liu Yanan; Li Shan; Zhou Suhong; Zhao Ruirui; Zhang Yuehong; Chen Jing; Song Nina; Wang Lina; Zhang Na (L); Zhang Ping Head coach: Chen Zhonghe	Russia Irina Tebenikhina; Elena Tyurina (L); Lioubov Chachkova; Natalya Safronova; Evgeniya Artamonova (c); Elizaveta Tishchenko; Olga Chukanova; Ekaterina Gamova; Marina Sheshenina; Alexandra Korukovets; Elena Plotnikova; Olga Nikolaeva Head coach: Nikolay Karpol	Cuba Zoila Barros; Rosir Calderón; Nancy Carrillo; Ana Fernández; Maybelis Martínez (L); Liana Mesa; Anniara Muñoz; Yahima Ortiz; Daymi Ramirez; Yumilka Ruíz (c); Marta Sánchez; Dulce Téllez Head coach: Luis Calderon

== Awards ==
- Most valuable player
  Feng Kun (CHN)
- Best scorer
  Ekaterina Gamova (RUS)
- Best spiker
  Zhang Ping (CHN)
- Best blocker
  Ekaterina Gamova (RUS)
- Best server
  Zoila Barros (CUB)
- Best digger
  Stacy Sykora (USA)
- Best setter
  Feng Kun (CHN)
- Best receiver
  Zhang Na (CHN)

== See also ==
- Volleyball at the Summer Olympics
- Volleyball at the 2004 Summer Olympics – Men's tournament
- Beach volleyball at the 2004 Summer Olympics – Women's tournament
- Sitting volleyball at the 2004 Summer Paralympics – Women's tournament
