= Sergei Baranov =

Sergei Baranov may refer to:

- Sergei Baranov (figure skater) (born 1983), Ukrainian ice dancer
- Sergei Baranov (volleyball) (born 1981), Russian volleyball player
