= Aleksandr Gorbatikov =

Russian handball player

Aleksand Gorbatikov
Personal information
- Full name: Aleksandr Valerevich Gorbatikov
- Nationality: Russian
- Born: 4 June 1982 (age 44) Volgograd, Russia
- Height: 187 cm (74 in)

Sport
- Sport: Handball
- Position: Centre back
- Current club: Retired

Senior clubs
- Years: Team
- 1999-2009: Dinamo Astrakhan
National team
Years	Team	Apps	(Gls)
2003-2009	Russia	24	(10)
Medal record
Men's handball
Representing Russia
Olympic Games
Bronze medal – third place	2004 Athens	Team
- Updated on 13 February 2014

Aleksandr Valerevich Gorbatikov (Russian: Александр Валерьевич Горбатиков, born 4 June 1982) is a Russian handball player who competed in the 2004 Summer Olympics.

He was born in Volgograd.

In 2004 he was a member of the Russian team which won the bronze medal in the Olympic tournament. He played one match.
