= Svetlana Bogdanova (water polo) =

Russian water polo player

Personal information
- Full name: Svetlana Viktorovna Bogdanova
- Nationality: Russia
- Born: 3 October 1976 (age 50) Kirishi, Soviet Union
- Height: 1.67 m (5 ft 6 in)
- Weight: 65 kg (143 lb)

Sport
- Sport: Water polo
- Position: driver

Senior clubs
- Years: Team
- ?-?: Kinef Kirishi
National team
- Years: Team
- ?-?: Russia
Medal record
Representing Russia
World Championships
Bronze medal – third place	2003 Barcelona	Team competition
European Championships
Bronze medal – third place	2003 Kranj	Team competition

Svetlana Viktorovna Bogdanova (Светлана Викторовна Богданова, born 3 October 1976) is a Russian female water polo player. She was a member of the Russia women's national water polo team, playing as a driver.

She was a part of the team at the 2004 Summer Olympics. On club level she played for Kinef Kirishi in Russia.

== See also ==
- List of World Aquatics Championships medalists in water polo
