= Nataliya Shalagina =

Russian former swimmer (born 1983)

Personal information
- Full name: Nataliya Dmitriyevna Shalagina
- National team: Russia
- Born: 1 September 1983 (age 42) Sverdlovsk, Russian SFSR, Soviet Union
- Height: 1.70 m (5 ft 7 in)
- Weight: 60 kg (132 lb)

Sport
- Sport: Swimming
- Strokes: Freestyle
- Club: PK Yekaterinburg
- Coach: Dmitry Shalagin

Nataliya Dmitriyevna Shalagina (Russian: Наталья Дмитриевна Шалагина; born 1 September 1983) is a Russian former swimmer, who specialized in freestyle events. She is a 2003 Russian swimming champion in the 100 m freestyle, and a two-time relay medalist at the Russian Championships (2003 and 2004). Shalagina is a member of PK Yekaterinburg, and is coached and trained by her father Dmitry Shalagin.

Shalagina qualified for two swimming events at the 2004 Summer Olympics by clearing a FINA A-standard entry time of 1:59.98 (200 m freestyle) from the Russian Championships in Moscow. In the 200 m freestyle, Shalagina challenged seven other swimmers on the fifth heat, including top medal favorite Federica Pellegrini of Italy. She edged out Brazil's Mariana Brochado to take a seventh spot and twenty-first overall by 0.54 of a second in 2:02.37.

Shalagina also teamed up with Oxana Verevka, Yelena Bogomazova, and Natalya Sutyagina in the 4×100 m medley relay. Swimming the freestyle leg, Shalagina recorded a time of 57.60, and the Russians finished the second heat in seventh spot and twelfth overall with a final time of 4:10.18.
