= Andrey Egorchev =

Russian volleyball player (born 1978)

Personal information
- Full name: Andrey Nikolaevich Egorchev
- Born: 8 February 1978 (age 48); Naberezhnye Chelny
Honours
Men's volleyball
Representing Russia
Olympic Games
| Bronze medal – third place | 2004 Athens | Team |

Andrey Nikolaevich Egorchev (Russian: Андрей Николаевич Егорчев, born 8 February 1978) is a Russian volleyball player who competed in the 2004 Summer Olympics.

Egorchev was born in the Tatar Autonomous Soviet Socialist Republic. In 2004, he was part of the Russian team that won the bronze medal in the Olympic tournament. He played six matches.
