= Marina Sheshenina =

Russian volleyball player (born 1985)

Marina Sheshina
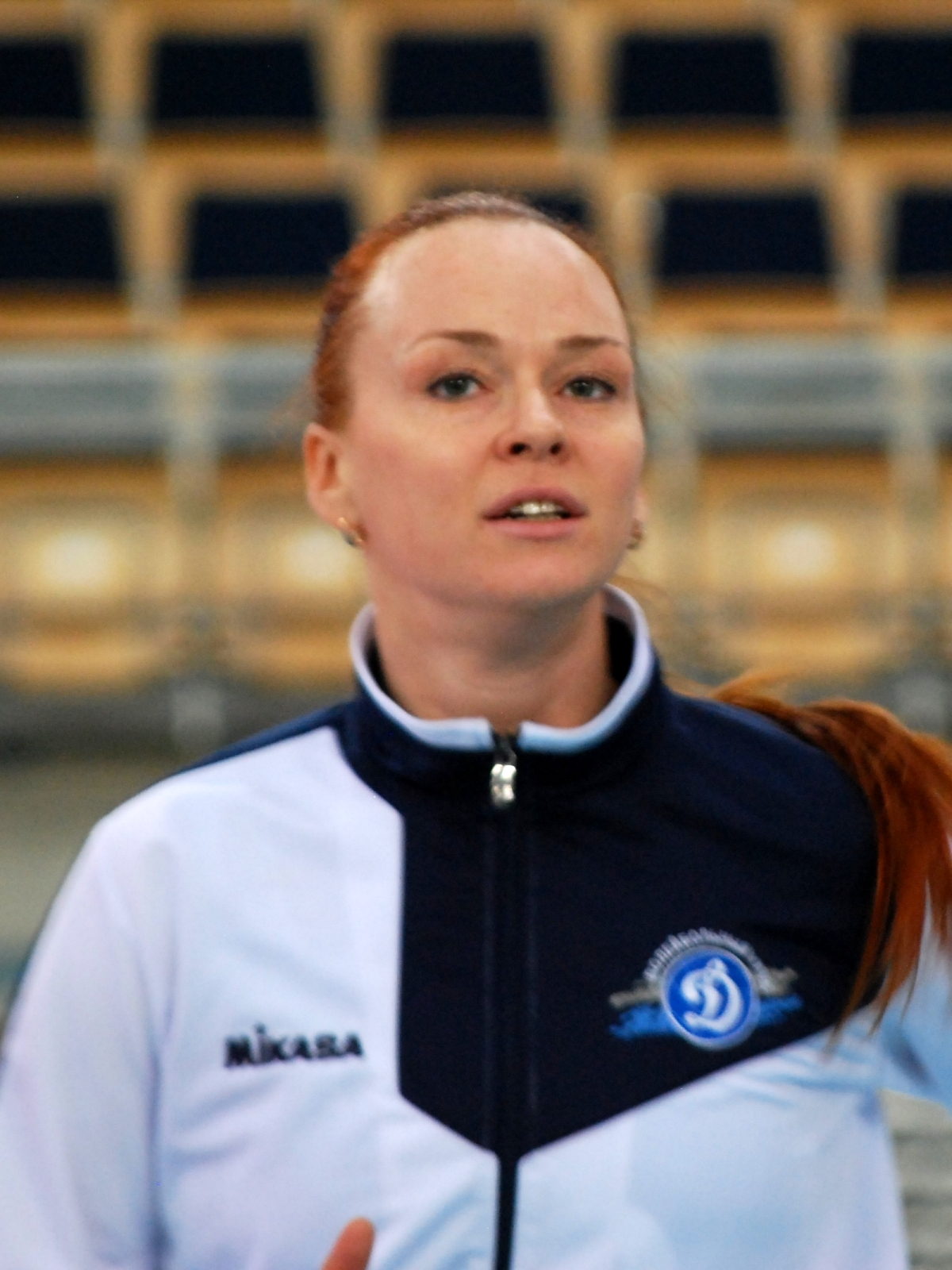

Personal information
- Nationality: Russian
- Born: 26 June 1985 (age 41)
- Height: 181 cm (5 ft 11 in)
- Weight: 62 kg (137 lb)
- Spike: 291 cm (115 in)
- Block: 289 cm (114 in)

Volleyball information
- Number: 12 (national team)

Career
Years	Teams
2018	WVC Dynamo Moscow

National team
2003 - 2009, 2016	Russia
Honours
Women's volleyball
Representing Russia
Olympic Games
Silver medal – second place	2004 Athens	Team competition
World Championship
Gold medal – first place	2006 Japan	Team competition
FIVB World Grand Prix
Silver medal – second place	2006 Reggio Calabria	Team
Silver medal – second place	2009 Tokyo	Team
European Championship
Bronze medal – third place	2005 Zagreb-Pula	Team
Bronze medal – third place	2007 Charleroi-Luxembourg	Team

Marina Igorevna Sheshenina (Russian: Марина Игоревна Шешенина) (born 26 June 1985 in Sverdlovsk) is a volleyball player from Russia, who plays as a setter. She was a member of the Women's National Team that won the gold medal at the 2006 FIVB Women's World Championship. She also competed at the 2004 Summer Olympics in Athens, Greece, claiming the silver medal.

== Clubs ==
- Uralochka-NTMK (2006)
