= Sergei Baranov (volleyball) =

Russian volleyball player

Medal record
Men's volleyball
Representing Russia
Olympic Games
Bronze medal – third place	2004 Athens	Team
European Championships
Silver medal – second place	2005 Belgrade-Rome	Team
Bronze medal – third place	2003 Berlin	Team

Sergey Andreyevich Baranov (Russian: Серге́й Андреевич Баранов; born 10 August 1981 in Horlivka) is a Russian former volleyball player. He was a member of the national team that won the bronze medal at the 2004 Summer Olympics in Athens. He also played for VC Lokomotiv-Belogorie.

== Trophies ==
- Club
  - Russian Volleyball Super League : 2003, 2004, 2005
  - Russian Volleyball Cup : 2003, 2005
  - CEV Champions League : 2003, 2004
- With the Russian National Team
  - Men's European Volleyball League : 2005
