= Olga Nikolaeva =

Russian volleyball player

Personal information
- Full name: Olga Viktorovna Nikolayeva
- Born: 14 May 1972 (age 54)
- Height: 190 cm (6 ft 3 in)
Medal record
Women's volleyball
Representing Russia
Olympic Games
Silver medal – second place	2004 Athens	Team competition

Olga Viktorovna Nikolaeva (Russian: Ольга Викторовна Николаева, (born 14 May 1972 in Novosibirsk) is a Russian former volleyball player. She was a member of the national team that won the silver medal at the 2004 Summer Olympics in Athens. She played for Dynamo Moscow.
