= Aleksandra Korukovets =

Russian volleyball player

Personal information
- Full name: Aleksandra Petrovna Korukovets
- Nationality: Russian
- Born: October 1, 1976 (age 50); Stepnoe, Saratov Oblast, Russia
- Height: 183 cm (6 ft 0 in)
Honours
Women's volleyball
Representing Russia
Olympic Games
Silver medal – second place	2004 Athens	Team
European Championship
Bronze medal – third place	1997 Arnhem-Groningen	Team

Aleksandra Petrovna Korukovets (Russian: Александра Петровна Коруковец; born October 1, 1976), née Sorokina (Russian: Сорокина), is a Russian former volleyball player. She was a member of the national team that won the silver medal at the 2004 Summer Olympics in Athens.
