= Olga Khrzhanovskaya =

Russian volleyball player (born 1980)

Personal information
- Full name: Olga Viktorovna Khrzhanovskaya
- Born: Olga Viktorovna Chukanova; 9 June 1980 (age 46); Temirtau, Kazakh SSR, Soviet Union
- Height: 1.80 m (5 ft 11 in)
Honours
Women's volleyball
Representing Russia
Olympic Games
Silver medal – second place	2004 Athens	Team
World Championship
Bronze medal – third place	1998 Japan	Team
Bronze medal – third place	2002 Germany	Team
European Championship
Gold medal – first place	1997 Brno	Team

Olga Viktorovna Khrzhanovskaya (Russian: Ольга Викторовна Хржановская; née Chukanova [Чуканова]; born 9 June 1980) is a former Russian volleyball player. She was a member of the national team that won the silver medal at the 2004 Summer Olympics in Athens.

She is married to volleyball coach and former player Dmitriy Khrzhanovskiy.

== Sources ==
- Sports-reference.com (archived)
