= Basketball at the 2004 Summer Olympics – Women's team rosters =

This is a list of the players who were on the rosters of the teams who participated in the 2004 Summer Olympics for women's basketball.

== Group A ==
=== Australia ===
The following is the Australia roster in the women's basketball tournament of the 2004 Summer Olympics.

Australia women's national basketball team – 2004 Summer Olympics roster
Players
Coaches

Pos.	No.	Name	Age – Date of birth	Height	Club	Ctr.
G	4	Alicia Poto	26 – 28 March 1978	1.66 m (5 ft 5 in)	Aix-en-Provence	(France)
G	5	Allison Tranquilli	31 – 12 September 1972	1.78 m (5 ft 10 in)	PVSK Pecs	(Hungary)
G	6	Sandy Brondello	35 – 20 August 1968	1.70 m (5 ft 7 in)	Ros Casares Valencia	(Spain)
F	7	Penny Taylor	23 – 24 May 1981	1.83 m (6 ft 0 in)	Phoenix Mercury	(United States)
C	8	Suzy Batkovic	23 – 17 December 1980	1.95 m (6 ft 5 in)	US Valenciennes	(France)
F	9	Trisha Fallon (C)	32 – 23 July 1972	1.90 m (6 ft 3 in)	Ros Casares Valencia	(Spain)
G	10	Kristi Harrower	29 – 4 March 1975	1.62 m (5 ft 4 in)	Aix-en-Provence	(France)
F	11	Laura Summerton	20 – 13 December 1983	1.89 m (6 ft 2 in)	Adelaide Lightning	(Australia)
G	12	Belinda Snell	23 – 10 January 1981	1.82 m (6 ft 0 in)	Sydney Uni Flames	(Australia)
F	13	Natalie Porter	23 – 16 December 1980	1.85 m (6 ft 1 in)	Townsville Fire	(Australia)
F	14	Rachael Sporn	36 – 26 May 1968	1.87 m (6 ft 2 in)	Adelaide Lightning	(Australia)
F	15	Lauren Jackson	23 – 11 May 1981	1.95 m (6 ft 5 in)	Seattle Storm	(United States)

Head coach

- (Australia) Jan Stirling

Assistant coach(es)

- (Australia) Karen Dalton
- (Australia) Chris Lucas

Legend

- (C) Team captain
- nat field describes country
  of last club
  before the tournament
- Age as of August 13, 2004

=== Brazil ===
The following is the Brazil roster in the women's basketball tournament of the 2004 Summer Olympics.

Brazil women's national basketball team – 2004 Summer Olympics roster
Players
Coaches

Pos.	No.	Name	Age – Date of birth	Height	Club	Ctr.
G	4	Adriana Moisés Pinto	25 – 6 December 1978	1.68 m (5 ft 6 in)	H.S. Penta Faenza	(Italy)
G	5	Helen Luz	31 – 23 November 1972	1.76 m (5 ft 9 in)	Dynamo Novosibirsk	(Russia)
G	6	Karla Costa	31 – 23 November 1972	1.76 m (5 ft 9 in)	Dynamo Novosibirsk	(Russia)
F/C	7	Leila Sobral	29 – 29 November 1974	1.89 m (6 ft 2 in)	São Paulo/Guaru	(Brazil)
F	8	Izi Castro Marques	22 – 13 March 1982	1.81 m (5 ft 11 in)	Phoenix Mercury	(United States)
F	9	Janeth Arcain (C)	35 – 11 April 1969	1.82 m (6 ft 0 in)	Phoenix Mercury	(United States)
G/F	10	Vivian Cristina Lopes	28 – 7 January 1976	1.74 m (5 ft 9 in)	Santo André/Semasa	(Brazil)
F	11	Silvia Cristina Rocha	22 – 14 May 1982	1.83 m (6 ft 0 in)	Unimed/Americana	(Brazil)
C	12	Érika de Souza	22 – 9 March 1982	1.97 m (6 ft 6 in)	UB-Barça	(Spain)
C	13	Alessandra de Oliveira	30 – 2 December 1973	2.00 m (6 ft 7 in)	Reyer Venezia Mestre	(Italy)
C	14	Cintia Santos	29 – 31 January 1975	1.96 m (6 ft 5 in)	Gambrinus Brno	(Czech Republic)
C	15	Kelly Santos	24 – 10 November 1979	1.93 m (6 ft 4 in)	CUS Chieti	(Italy)

Head coach

- (Brazil) Antonio Barbosa

Assistant coach(es)

- (Brazil) Paulo Campos

Legend

- nat field describes country
  of last club
  before the tournament
- Age as of August 13, 2004

=== Greece ===
The following is the Greece roster in the women's basketball tournament of the 2004 Summer Olympics.

Greece women's national basketball team – 2004 Summer Olympics roster
Players
Coaches

Pos.	No.	Name	Age – Date of birth	Height	Club	Ctr.
G	4	Tatiana Kavvadia	27 – 23 September 1976	1.80 m (5 ft 11 in)	Megas Alexandros	(Greece)
G	5	Anastasia Kostaki	26 – 26 March 1978	1.72 m (5 ft 8 in)	Meverin Parma	(Italy)
G	6	Aikaterini Deli	29 – 12 January 1975	1.66 m (5 ft 5 in)	Dasal	(Greece)
G	7	Dimitra Kalentzou	26 – 3 January 1978	1.74 m (5 ft 9 in)	Sporting Athens	(Greece)
G	8	Atalanti Maria Tasouli	27 – 28 September 1976	1.78 m (5 ft 10 in)	Sporting Athens	(Greece)
F	9	Evanthia Maltsi	25 – 30 December 1978	1.80 m (5 ft 11 in)	Panathinaikos	(Greece)
C	10	Polymnia Saregkou	32 – 11 May 1972	1.85 m (6 ft 1 in)	San Sebastián	(Spain)
F	11	Eleni Vasileiou	30 – 29 July 1974	1.84 m (6 ft 0 in)	Dasal	(Greece)
C	12	Eirini Stachtiari	27 – 27 July 1977	1.92 m (6 ft 4 in)	Glyfada Esperides	(Greece)
C	13	Maria Samoroukova	32 – 19 December 1971	1.91 m (6 ft 3 in)	Dynamo Moscow	(Russia)
F	14	Athina Christoforaki	23 – 6 November 1980	1.83 m (6 ft 0 in)	Panserraikos	(Greece)
F/C	15	Sofia Kligkopoulou (C)	34 – 6 January 1970	1.90 m (6 ft 3 in)	Dasal	(Greece)

Head coach

- (Greece) Georgios Tsitskaris

Assistant coach(es)

- (Greece) Panagiotis Vafeiadis
- (Greece) Dimitris Bakogeorgos

Legend

- (C) Team captain
- nat field describes country
  of last club
  before the tournament
- Age as of August 13, 2004

=== Japan ===
The following is the Japan roster in the women's basketball tournament of the 2004 Summer Olympics.

Japan women's national basketball team – 2004 Summer Olympics roster
Players
Coaches

Pos.	No.	Name	Age – Date of birth	Height	Club	Ctr.
C	4	Noriko Hamaguchi	30 – 15 January 1974	1.83 m (6 ft 0 in)	Japan Energy	(Japan)
F	5	Mari Konno	24 – 18 May 1980	1.78 m (5 ft 10 in)	Japan Energy	(Japan)
G	6	Taeko Oyama (C)	30 – 18 June 1974	1.73 m (5 ft 8 in)	Japan Energy	(Japan)
G	7	Natsumi Yabuuchi	27 – 21 July 1977	1.75 m (5 ft 9 in)	Japan Airlines Rabbits	(Japan)
F	8	Hiromi Kawabata	25 – 23 May 1979	1.80 m (5 ft 11 in)	Japan Energy	(Japan)
G	9	Kaori Kusuda	30 – 29 March 1974	1.65 m (5 ft 5 in)	Japan Energy	(Japan)
F	10	Ryoko Yano	25 – 20 December 1978	1.78 m (5 ft 10 in)	Japan Energy	(Japan)
C	11	Maki Eguchi	25 – 14 October 1978	1.84 m (6 ft 0 in)	Chanson Cosmetics	(Japan)
G	12	Masami Tachikawa	23 – 16 November 1980	1.71 m (5 ft 7 in)	Japan Energy	(Japan)
G	13	Yuko Oga	21 – 17 October 1982	1.70 m (5 ft 7 in)	Japan Energy	(Japan)
C	14	Naomi Yashiro	26 – 30 December 1977	1.82 m (6 ft 0 in)	Japan Airlines Rabbits	(Japan)
F	15	Mutsuko Nagata	27 – 26 September 1976	1.78 m (5 ft 10 in)	Chanson Cosmetics	(Japan)

Head coach

- (Japan) Tomohide Utsumi

Assistant coach(es)

- (Japan) Eiki Umezaki
- (Japan) Mikiko Hagiwara

Legend

- (C) Team captain
- nat field describes country
  of last club
  before the tournament
- Age as of August 13, 2004

=== Nigeria ===
The following is the Nigeria roster in the women's basketball tournament of the 2004 Summer Olympics.

Nigeria women's national basketball team – 2004 Summer Olympics roster
Players
Coaches

Pos.	No.	Name	Age – Date of birth	Height	Club	Ctr.
G	4	Umoh Itoro	27 – 21 February 1977	1.83 m (6 ft 0 in)	Clemson University	(United States)
F	5	Joanne Aluka	25 – 26 April 1979	1.81 m (5 ft 11 in)	GD Gafanha da Nazaré	(Portugal)
G	6	Mobolaji Akiode	22 – 12 May 1982	1.78 m (5 ft 10 in)	Pully Basket	(Switzerland)
G	7	Juliana Negedu	25 – 31 July 1979	1.85 m (6 ft 1 in)	Aris Thivas	(Greece)
F/C	8	Ugo Oha	22 – 18 July 1982	1.93 m (6 ft 4 in)	George Washington University	(United States)
F	9	Aisha Mohammed	18 – 21 October 1985	1.93 m (6 ft 4 in)	First Bank	(Nigeria)
G/F	10	Nguveren Iyorhe	23 – 9 June 1981	1.87 m (6 ft 2 in)	First Bank	(Nigeria)
F	11	Mfon Udoka	28 – 16 June 1976	1.88 m (6 ft 2 in)	Houston Comets	(United States)
F	12	Rashidat Sadiq	23 – 3 January 1981	1.88 m (6 ft 2 in)	University of Connecticut	(United States)
G	13	Mactabene Amachree	26 – 30 January 1978	1.90 m (6 ft 3 in)	Istanbul University	(Turkey)
C	14	Taiwo Rafiu	32 – 18 June 1972	1.82 m (6 ft 0 in)	Kookmni Bank	(Nigeria)
C	15	Linda Ogugua	26 – 12 April 1978	1.98 m (6 ft 6 in)	Biola University	(United States)

Head coach

- (Nigeria) Sam Vincent

Assistant coach(es)

- (Nigeria) Scott Nnaji

Legend

- (C) Team captain
- nat field describes country
  of last club
  before the tournament
- Age as of August 13, 2004

=== Russia ===
The following is the Russia roster in the women's basketball tournament of the 2004 Summer Olympics.

Russia women's national basketball team – 2004 Summer Olympics roster
Players
Coaches

Pos.	No.	Name	Age – Date of birth	Height	Club	Ctr.
F	4	Olga Arteshina	21 – 27 November 1982	1.82 m (6 ft 0 in)	VBM-SGAU Samara	(Russia)
G	5	Oxana Rakhmatulina	27 – 7 December 1976	1.76 m (5 ft 9 in)	VBM-SGAU Samara	(Russia)
F	6	Natalia Vodopyanova	23 – 4 June 1981	1.90 m (6 ft 3 in)	Lotos VBW Clima Gdynia	(Poland)
G	7	Diana Goustilina	30 – 21 April 1974	1.85 m (6 ft 1 in)	UMMC Ekaterinburg	(Russia)
F	8	Elena Baranova (C)	32 – 28 January 1972	1.92 m (6 ft 4 in)	UMMC Ekaterinburg	(Russia)
C	9	Tatiana Shchegoleva	22 – 9 February 1982	1.92 m (6 ft 4 in)	VBM-SGAU Samara	(Russia)
G	10	Ilona Korstin	24 – 30 May 1980	1.83 m (6 ft 0 in)	VBM-SGAU Samara	(Russia)
C	11	Maria Stepanova	25 – 23 February 1979	2.03 m (6 ft 8 in)	VBM-SGAU Samara	(Russia)
C	12	Maria Kalmykova	26 – 14 January 1978	1.90 m (6 ft 3 in)	Dynamo Novosibirsk	(Russia)
F	13	Elena Karpova	24 – 14 June 1980	1.88 m (6 ft 2 in)	Lattes-Maurin Montpellier	(France)
F	14	Irina Osipova	23 – 25 June 1981	2.00 m (6 ft 7 in)	UMMC Ekaterinburg	(Russia)
G	15	Anna Arkhipova	31 – 27 July 1973	1.78 m (5 ft 10 in)	UMMC Ekaterinburg	(Russia)

Head coach

- (Russia) Vadim Kapranov

Assistant coach(es)

- (Russia) Valeriy Lunichkin

Legend

- (C) Team captain
- nat field describes country
  of last club
  before the tournament
- Age as of August 13, 2004

== Group B ==
=== China ===
The following is the China roster in the women's basketball tournament of the 2004 Summer Olympics.

China women's national basketball team – 2004 Summer Olympics roster
Players
Coaches

Pos.	No.	Name	Age – Date of birth	Height	Club	Ctr.
G	4	Song Xiaoyun	21 – 11 December 1982	1.75 m (5 ft 9 in)	Guangdong Hongjia	(China)
F	5	Bian Lan	17 – 16 August 1986	1.80 m (5 ft 11 in)	Jiangsu Phoenix	(China)
F	6	Pan Wei	26 – 11 June 1978	1.80 m (5 ft 11 in)	Guangdong Hongjia	(China)
F	7	Hu Xiaotao	23 – 12 June 1981	1.87 m (6 ft 2 in)	Shenyang Army Golden Lions	(China)
F	8	Miao Lijie	23 – 3 June 1981	1.78 m (5 ft 10 in)	Heilongjiang Dragons	(China)
F	9	Zhang Fan	19 – 22 August 1984	1.87 m (6 ft 2 in)	Beijing Great Wall	(China)
F	10	Sui Feifei (C)	25 – 29 January 1979	1.83 m (6 ft 0 in)	Bayi Kylin	(China)
C	11	Ye Li	22 – 20 November 1981	1.90 m (6 ft 3 in)	Shanghai Octopus	(China)
C	12	Chen Luyun	27 – 7 June 1977	1.88 m (6 ft 2 in)	Fujian Tailaoshan	(China)
C	13	Wang Ling	26 – 9 June 1978	1.90 m (6 ft 3 in)	Liaoning Baocheng	(China)
F	14	Ren Lei	22 – 22 January 1982	1.84 m (6 ft 0 in)	Bayi Kylin	(China)
C	15	Chen Nan	21 – 8 January 1983	1.95 m (6 ft 5 in)	Bayi Kylin	(China)

Head coach

- (China) Gong Luming

Assistant coach(es)

- (China) Chen Dechum

Legend

- (C) Team captain
- nat field describes country
  of last club
  before the tournament
- Age as of August 13, 2004

=== Czech Republic ===
The following is the Czech Republic roster in the women's basketball tournament of the 2004 Summer Olympics.

Czech Republic women's national basketball team – 2004 Summer Olympics roster
Players
Coaches

Pos.	No.	Name	Age – Date of birth	Height	Club	Ctr.
F	4	Jana Veselá	20 – 31 December 1983	1.95 m (6 ft 5 in)	Gambrinus Brno	(Czech Republic)
C	5	Ivana Večeřová	25 – 30 March 1979	1.94 m (6 ft 4 in)	Gambrinus Brno	(Czech Republic)
F	6	Ivana Voračková	24 – 28 August 1979	1.85 m (6 ft 1 in)	UŠK Blex Prague	(Czech Republic)
F	7	Michala Hartigová	20 – 14 November 1983	1.82 m (6 ft 0 in)	Kara Trutnov	(Czech Republic)
G	8	Michaela Uhrová	22 – 10 April 1982	1.66 m (5 ft 5 in)	Gambrinus Brno	(Czech Republic)
G	9	Hana Machová (C)	24 – 11 September 1979	1.82 m (6 ft 0 in)	Gambrinus Brno	(Czech Republic)
G	10	Romana Hamzová	33 – 17 August 1970	1.76 m (5 ft 9 in)	Gambrinus Brno	(Czech Republic)
F	11	Michaela Pavlíčková	26 – 27 September 1977	1.90 m (6 ft 3 in)	Dynamo Moscow	(Russia)
F	12	Irena Borecká	23 – 5 November 1980	1.75 m (5 ft 9 in)	Kara Trutnov	(Czech Republic)
C	13	Petra Kulichová	19 – 13 September 1984	1.98 m (6 ft 6 in)	Kara Trutnov	(Czech Republic)
C	14	Zuzana Klimešová	25 – 21 January 1979	1.87 m (6 ft 2 in)	Asteras Exarchion	(Greece)
F	15	Eva Vítečková	22 – 26 January 1982	1.90 m (6 ft 3 in)	Gambrinus Brno	(Czech Republic)

Head coach

- (Czech Republic) Jan Bobrovský

Assistant coach(es)

- (Czech Republic) Lubor Blažek

Legend

- (C) Team captain
- nat field describes country
  of last club before the
  tournament
- Age as of August 13, 2004

=== New Zealand ===
The following is the New Zealand roster in the women's basketball tournament of the 2004 Summer Olympics.

New Zealand women's national basketball team – 2004 Summer Olympics roster
Players
Coaches

Pos.	No.	Name	Age – Date of birth	Height	Club	Ctr.
G	4	Leanne Walker (C)	26 – 28 March 1978	1.66 m (5 ft 5 in)	Waikato Lady Titans	(New Zealand)
F	5	Rebecca Cotton	29 – 23 August 1974	1.84 m (6 ft 0 in)	Launceston Tornadoes	(Australia)
G	6	Angela Marino	18 – 3 February 1986	1.66 m (5 ft 5 in)	Adelaide Sturt Sabres	(Australia)
G	7	Kim Wielens	26 – 25 September 1977	1.77 m (5 ft 10 in)	Nelson Sparks	(New Zealand)
G	8	Megan Compain	28 – 18 September 1975	1.75 m (5 ft 9 in)	Rhondda Rebels	(United Kingdom)
F	9	Donna Loffhagen	26 – 29 April 1978	1.85 m (6 ft 1 in)	Otago Breakers	(New Zealand)
C	10	Gina Farmer	29 – 12 December 1974	1.87 m (6 ft 2 in)	NKK Szolnok	(Hungary)
G	11	Tania Tupu	30 – 28 December 1973	1.80 m (5 ft 11 in)	Waikato Lady Titans	(New Zealand)
F/C	12	Sally Farmer	28 – 20 May 1976	1.88 m (6 ft 2 in)	Canterbury Wildcats	(New Zealand)
F	13	Julie Ofsoski	31 – 4 April 1973	1.80 m (5 ft 11 in)	Knox Raiders	(Australia)
F	14	Jody Tini	28 – 10 February 1976	1.79 m (5 ft 10 in)	Waikato Lady Titans	(New Zealand)
F	15	Aneka Kerr	23 – 1 March 1981	1.83 m (6 ft 0 in)	Townsville Fire	(Australia)

Head coach

- (New Zealand) Tom Maher

Assistant coach(es)

- (New Zealand) Kirstin Daly
- (New Zealand) Mike McHugh

Legend

- (C) Team captain
- nat field describes country
  of last club
  before the tournament
- Age as of 13 August 2004

=== South Korea ===
The following is the South Korea roster in the women's basketball tournament of the 2004 Summer Olympics.

South Korea women's national basketball team – 2004 Summer Olympics roster
Players
Coaches

Pos.	No.	Name	Age – Date of birth	Height	Club	Ctr.
G	4	Kim Yeong-ok	30 – 4 March 1974	1.68 m (5 ft 6 in)	KB Stars	(South Korea)
G	5	Lee Mi-sun	25 – 19 February 1979	1.74 m (5 ft 9 in)	Samsung	(South Korea)
G	6	Kim Ji-hyun	19 – 2 February 1985	1.78 m (5 ft 10 in)	Chuncheon Woori Bank Hansae	(South Korea)
C	7	Kang Ji-sook	25 – 4 February 1979	1.98 m (6 ft 6 in)	Cheongju SK Knights	(South Korea)
F	8	Cho Hey-jin (C)	30 – 25 September 1973	1.78 m (5 ft 10 in)	Chuncheon Woori Bank Hansae	(South Korea)
F/C	9	Hur Yoon-ja	25 – 19 April 1979	1.83 m (6 ft 0 in)	Shinsegae Cool Cats	(South Korea)
F	10	Beon Yeon-ha	24 – 7 March 1980	1.82 m (6 ft 0 in)	Samsung	(South Korea)
F	11	Park Jung-eun	27 – 14 January 1977	1.80 m (5 ft 11 in)	Samsung	(South Korea)
F/C	12	Jung Mi-ran	19 – 20 March 1985	1.83 m (6 ft 0 in)	Kumho Redwings	(South Korea)
C	13	Lee Jong-ae	29 – 18 March 1975	1.87 m (6 ft 2 in)	Chuncheon Woori Bank Hansae	(South Korea)
C	14	Kim Kwe-ryong	24 – 17 December 1979	1.91 m (6 ft 3 in)	Samsung	(South Korea)
C	15	Hong Hyun-hee	22 – 24 January 1982	1.91 m (6 ft 3 in)	Chuncheon Woori Bank Hansae	(South Korea)

Head coach

- (South Korea) Park Myung-soo

Assistant coach(es)

- (South Korea) Lee Young-ju

Legend

- (C) Team captain
- nat field describes country
  of last club
  before the tournament
- Age as of August 13, 2004

=== Spain ===
The following is the Spain roster in the women's basketball tournament of the 2004 Summer Olympics.

Spain women's national basketball team – 2004 Summer Olympics roster
Players
Coaches

Pos.	No.	Name	Age – Date of birth	Height	Club	Ctr.
F	4	Sonia Blanco	31 – 24 April 1973	1.85 m (6 ft 1 in)	Adecco Estudiantes	(Spain)
G	5	Rosi Sánchez	29 – 2 December 1974	1.76 m (5 ft 9 in)	Pantere	(Italy)
F	6	Laia Palau	24 – 10 September 1979	1.78 m (5 ft 10 in)	UB-Barça	(Spain)
G	7	Nuria Martínez	20 – 29 February 1984	1.74 m (5 ft 9 in)	Perfumerías Salamanca	(Spain)
G	8	Marta Fernández	22 – 21 December 1981	1.79 m (5 ft 10 in)	Ros Casares Valencia	(Spain)
F	9	Amaya Valdemoro	27 – 18 August 1976	1.83 m (6 ft 0 in)	Ros Casares Valencia	(Spain)
F	10	Elisa Aguilar	27 – 15 October 1976	1.89 m (6 ft 2 in)	Ros Casares Valencia	(Spain)
G	11	Begoña García	28 – 11 March 1976	1.70 m (5 ft 7 in)	Basket Parma	(Italy)
C	12	Ingrid Pons	29 – 27 February 1975	1.85 m (6 ft 1 in)	Ros Casares Valencia	(Spain)
F	13	Marina Ferragut	32 – 11 February 1972	1.90 m (6 ft 3 in)	Perfumerías Salamanca	(Spain)
C	14	Elisabeth Cebrián (C)	33 – 6 February 1971	1.96 m (6 ft 5 in)	Adecco Estudiantes	(Spain)
C	15	Lucila Pascua	21 – 21 March 1983	1.95 m (6 ft 5 in)	Filtros Mann Zaragoza	(Spain)

Head coach

- (Spain) Vicente Rodríguez

Assistant coach(es)

- (Spain) Fernando Merchante

Legend

- (C) Team captain
- nat field describes country
  of last club
  before the tournament
- Age as of August 13, 2004

=== United States ===
The following is the United States roster in the women's basketball tournament of the 2004 Summer Olympics.

United States women's national basketball team – 2004 Summer Olympics roster
Players
Coaches

Pos.	No.	Name	Age – Date of birth	Height	Club	Ctr.
G	4	Shannon Johnson	29 – 18 August 1974	1.82 m (6 ft 0 in)	San Antonio Silver Stars	(United States)
G	5	Dawn Staley	34 – 4 May 1970	1.65 m (5 ft 5 in)	Charlotte Sting	(United States)
G	6	Sue Bird	23 – 16 October 1980	1.75 m (5 ft 9 in)	Seattle Storm	(United States)
F	7	Sheryl Swoopes	33 – 25 March 1971	1.82 m (6 ft 0 in)	Houston Comets	(United States)
C	8	Ruth Riley	24 – 28 August 1979	1.95 m (6 ft 5 in)	Detroit Shock	(United States)
C	9	Lisa Leslie	32 – 7 July 1972	1.95 m (6 ft 5 in)	Los Angeles Sparks	(United States)
F	10	Tamika Catchings	25 – 21 July 1979	1.85 m (6 ft 1 in)	Indiana Fever	(United States)
F	11	Tina Thompson	29 – 10 February 1975	1.87 m (6 ft 2 in)	Houston Comets	(United States)
G	12	Diana Taurasi	22 – 11 June 1982	1.82 m (6 ft 0 in)	Phoenix Mercury	(United States)
F/C	13	Yolanda Griffith	34 – 1 March 1970	1.93 m (6 ft 4 in)	Sacramento Monarchs	(United States)
G	14	Katie Smith	30 – 4 June 1974	1.80 m (5 ft 11 in)	Minnesota Lynx	(United States)
F	15	Swin Cash	24 – 22 September 1979	1.87 m (6 ft 2 in)	Detroit Shock	(United States)

Head coach

- (United States) Van Chancellor

Assistant coach(es)

- (United States) Anne Donovan
- (United States) Gail Goestenkors
- (United States) Vivian Stringer

Legend

- (C) Team captain
- nat field describes country
  of last club
  before the tournament
- Age as of August 13, 2004
