= Mi-ran =

- Hangul: 미란
- RR: Miran
- MR: Miran

Mi-ran is a Korean given name.

People with this name include:

- Ra Mi-ran (born 1975), South Korean actress
- Hong Mi-ran (born 1977), South Korean television screenwriter, one of the Hong sisters
- Kwak Mi-ran (born 1981), South Korean volleyball player
- Jang Mi-ran (born 1983), South Korean weightlifter
- Jung Mi-ran (born 1985), South Korean basketball player

== See also ==
- List of Korean given names
