= Voráček =

Voráček (feminine: Voráčková) is a Czech surname. Notable people with the surname include:

- Ivana Voračková (born 1979), Czech basketball player
- Jakub Voráček (born 1989), Czech ice hockey player
- Martin Voráček (born 1992), Czech footballer
- Tomáš Voráček (born 1990), Czech ice hockey player
- Veronika Voráčková (born 1999), Czech basketball player
