= Christoforaki =

Christoforaki is a surname. Notable people with the surname include:

- Athina Christoforaki (born 1980), Greek basketball player
- Kostas Christoforakis, Greek football manager
