= Brazil at the 2012 Summer Olympics =

- IOC code: BRA
- NOC: Brazilian Olympic Committee
- Website: www.cob.org.br (in Portuguese)

in London
- Competitors: 259 in 24 sports
- Flag bearers: Rodrigo Pessoa (opening); Esquiva Falcão (closing)
- Medals Ranked 22nd: Gold 3 Silver 5 Bronze 9 Total 17

Summer Olympics appearances (overview)
- 1920; 1924; 1928; 1932; 1936; 1948; 1952; 1956; 1960; 1964; 1968; 1972; 1976; 1980; 1984; 1988; 1992; 1996; 2000; 2004; 2008; 2012; 2016; 2020; 2024; 2028

Brazil competed at the 2012 Summer Olympics in London, from 27 July to 12 August 2012. This was the nation's twenty-first appearance at the Summer Olympics, having missed the 1928 Summer Olympics in Amsterdam. The Brazilian Olympic Committee (Comitê Olímpico Brasileiro, COB) sent a total of 258 athletes to the Games, 136 men and 122 women, to compete in 24 sports. Brazil left London with a total of 17 Olympic medals (3 gold, 5 silver, and 9 bronze), winning their third-largest number of medals at a single games.

Brazilian athletes won their first ever medals in two sports: modern pentathlon, with the bronze medal won by Yane Marques in women's event, and in gymnastics, with the gold medal achieved by Arthur Zanetti in men's rings.

== Summary ==
The good overall result of the Brazilian team was begun by the judo team during the first days of the Games. The first gold medal went to the judoka Sarah Menezes in the women's 48 kg category. Menezes was the first Brazilian woman judoka to become an Olympic champion. At the Beijing Olympics, she competed at the age of 18 and, inexperienced, was defeated in the first fight. The gold medal came with victory by judge's decision over Romanian Alina Dumitru, who had been the champion in Beijing. It was also the first gold medal in judo for Brazil in 20 years, the previous was won by Rogério Sampaio, in Barcelona 1992. The other 3 medals in judo at the 2012 Olympics were bronze: Felipe Kitadai in men's 60 kg, Mayra Aguiar in women's 78 kg and Rafael Silva in men's +100 kg.

In the second week of the Games, the Brazilian Olympics team achieved another first; the gymnast Arthur Zanetti won the gold medal in men's rings. Arthur Zanetti had already shown his potential in the 2011 World Artistic Gymnastics Championships when he won the silver medal. After being 4th place in the qualification to the rings final, with a score of 15.616, he won the gold medal with a score of 15.900. He was the first gymnast from Latin America to win an Olympic medal and also the first from the southern hemisphere.

On the penultimate day of the Games, Team Brasil won its third gold medal, the only gold they won in a team event at this Olympics. In the women's volleyball competition, the Brazil women's national volleyball team, the reigning Olympic champions retained their title. Their path to the title was not straight forward. The first game in the group stage against the Turkish team almost ended in defeat. This was followed by a shock loss to the United States. Due to a defeat for South Korea in the other game, the combination of results meant Brazil faced elimination, having to win the next two games against China and Serbia and hoping for the United States to win their last two games (against South Korea and Turkey). That combination of results occurred. This meant Brazil faced a quarter-final clash against Russia. This game is considered one of the greatest volleyball games of all time, due to a fierce rivalry that had developed over previous clashes, such as the semi-finals of the Athens 2004 Olympic Games, the 2006 FIVB Women's Volleyball World Championship and the 2010 FIVB Women's Volleyball World Championship. In all these games, Brazil ended up losing to Russia in the fifth set by extremely tight scores. This game followed the script of the previous decisive games, but with a twist; Brazil managed to reverse six match points throughout the game. In the fifth set, after several physical and mental tests, the team managed to win the game, winning the set 21 to 19.

In the semi-finals, the team beat Japan 3 to 0. Thus, the team managed to reach its second consecutive final against another great rival, the United States. This was a repeat of the final held 4 years earlier in Beijing. But this time, the United States team was the favorite to win. After losing the first set (25–11), Brazil won the next three sets (25–17, 25–20 and 25–17) and the team won their second gold medal. For half of individuals in the team it was also their second gold medal: Fabiana Claudino, Fabiana de Oliveira, Paula Pequeno, Jaqueline Carvalho, Sheilla Castro and Thaísa Menezes made history to be the first Brazilian women to become two-time Olympic champions. The coach José Roberto Guimarães also wrote his name in history as the first three-time Olympic volleyball champion (male or female).

The Brazil men's national volleyball team won the silver medal in their tournament, losing the gold medal 3 to 2 to Russia in a dramatic match. Brazilian won the first two sets, and had two gold medal match points, but, led by Dmitriy Muserskiy, the Russians won the next 3 sets and the gold medal.

In the beach volleyball two medals were won. In the Men's beach volleyball, Alison Cerutti and Emanuel Rego reached the final against the Germans Julius Brink and Jonas Reckermann and fought a balanced duel that ended with a tight victory by the German team, 2 sets to 1 (23/21, 16/21 and 16/14). In the women's beach volleyball, a bronze medal was won by Juliana Felisberta and Larissa França.

In the football men's tournament, the Brazil national under-23 football team led by Neymar advanced as favourite to the final against Mexico, after 5 victories in 5 matches. But a fast goal from Mexican Oribe Peralta with only 29 seconds gone in the first half, destabilized the Brazilian players. In the second half of the match, Peralta scored again at 74 minutes. Brazil scored a goal in the 91st minute, but there was no time for the tie and the match ended in 2 to 1.

In the pool at the 2012 Summer Olympics, two medals were achieved. Thiago Pereira finally won an Olympic medal in the Men's 400 m individual medley with a South American record of 4:08.86. César Cielo, the incumbent Olympic and World Champion, won the bronze medal in the Men's 50 m freestyle.

In the boxing, Brazil won medals for the first time since the 1968 Summer Olympics in Mexico City. In the first ever women's boxing event at the Olympics, Adriana Araujo had the honor of being the first Brazilian woman to win a medal in boxing, a bronze in the Women's lightweight. It was also the 100th medal for Brazil at the Olympics. Esquiva Falcão was the silver medalist in men's middleweight after losing to the Japanese boxer Ryota Murata by 14 to 13. Esquiva's brother Yamaguchi Falcão was the bronze medalist in the men's light heavyweight.

Sailors Robert Scheidt and Bruno Prada took the bronze medal in the Star class. Robert became one of the most successful Brazilian athletes in history with a total of five Olympic medals, tying the record of Torben Grael. He is also one of the sailors with the largest number of Olympic medals of all time, along with Torben Grael and British Ben Ainslie.

Finally, Brazil won a medal in the last final of the 2012 Summer Olympics: the women's event in modern pentathlon. Yane Marques was the bronze medalist with 5340 points. This was the first medal ever won by Brazilians in modern pentathlon at the Summer Olympics.

With Rio de Janeiro being the host city of the 2016 Summer Olympics, a Brazilian segment was performed during the closing ceremony.

== Medalists ==
Medal	Name	Sport	Event	Date
Gold	Sarah Menezes	Judo	Women's 48 kg	July 28
Gold	Arthur Zanetti	Gymnastics	Men's rings	August 6
Gold	Brazil women's national volleyball team: Fabiana Claudino; Dani Lins; Paula Pequeno; Adenízia da Silva; Thaísa Menezes; Jaqueline Carvalho; Fernanda Ferreira; Tandara Caixeta; Natália Pereira; Sheilla Castro; Fernanda Garay; Fabiana de Oliveira	Volleyball	Women's tournament	August 11
Silver	Thiago Pereira	Swimming	Men's 400 m individual medley	July 28
Silver	Alison Cerutti; Emanuel Rego	Volleyball	Men's beach volleyball	August 9
Silver	Brazil national under-23 football team: Gabriel; Rafael; Thiago Silva; Juan Jesus; Sandro; Marcelo; Lucas; Rômulo; Leandro Damião; Oscar; Neymar; Hulk; Bruno Uvini; Danilo; Alex Sandro; Ganso; Alexandre Pato; Neto	Football	Men's tournament	August 11
Silver	Esquiva Falcão Florentino	Boxing	Men's middleweight	August 11
Silver	Brazil men's national volleyball team: Bruno Rezende; Wallace de Souza; Sidnei dos Santos Júnior; Leandro Vissotto; Gilberto Godoy Filho; Murilo Endres; Sérgio Santos; Thiago Alves; Rodrigo Santana; Lucas Saatkamp; Ricardo Garcia; Dante Amaral	Volleyball	Men's tournament	August 12
Bronze	Felipe Kitadai	Judo	Men's 60 kg	July 28
Bronze	Mayra Aguiar	Judo	Women's 78 kg	August 2
Bronze	Rafael Silva	Judo	Men's +100 kg	August 3
Bronze	César Cielo	Swimming	Men's 50 m freestyle	August 3
Bronze	Robert Scheidt; Bruno Prada	Sailing	Star class	August 5
Bronze	Adriana Araujo	Boxing	Women's lightweight	August 8
Bronze	Juliana Felisberta; Larissa França	Volleyball	Women's beach volleyball	August 8
Bronze	Yamaguchi Falcão	Boxing	Men's light heavyweight	August 10
Bronze	Yane Marques	Modern pentathlon	Women's event	August 12

Medals by sport
Sport	1st place, gold medalist(s)	2nd place, silver medalist(s)	3rd place, bronze medalist(s)	Total
Volleyball	1	2	1	4
Judo	1	0	3	4
Gymnastics	1	0	0	1
Boxing	0	1	2	3
Swimming	0	1	1	2
Football	0	1	0	1
Sailing	0	0	1	1
Modern pentathlon	0	0	1	1
Total	3	5	9	17

Medals by date
Date	1st place, gold medalist(s)	2nd place, silver medalist(s)	3rd place, bronze medalist(s)	Total
28 July	1	1	1	3
29 July	0	0	0	0
30 July	0	0	0	0
31 July	0	0	0	0
1 Aug	0	0	0	0
2 Aug	0	0	1	1
3 Aug	0	0	2	2
4 Aug	0	0	0	0
5 Aug	0	0	1	1
6 Aug	1	0	0	1
7 Aug	0	0	0	0
8 Aug	0	0	2	2
9 Aug	0	1	0	1
10 Aug	0	0	1	1
11 Aug	1	2	0	3
12 Aug	0	1	1	2
Total	3	5	9	17

Medals by gender
Gender	1st place, gold medalist(s)	2nd place, silver medalist(s)	3rd place, bronze medalist(s)	Total
Male	1	5	5	11
Female	2	0	4	6
Mixed	0	0	0	0
Total	3	5	9	17

== Delegation ==
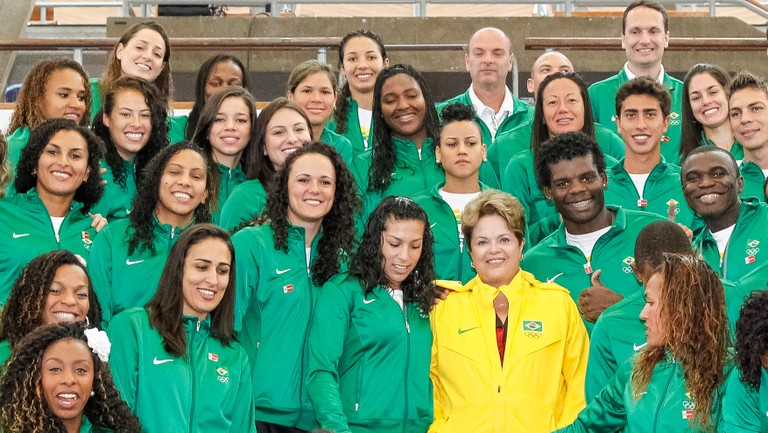
Brazilian President Dilma Rousseff with part of the Olympic delegation.

The Brazilian Olympic Committee selected a team of 258 athletes, 136 men and 122 women, to compete in all sports, except badminton and field hockey; it was the nation's second-largest team sent to the Olympics, failing by only five athletes short of the record in Beijing. There was only a single competitor in archery, slalom canoeing, modern pentathlon, and freestyle wrestling. Brazil also marked its Olympic return in men's basketball after a sixteen-year absence.

The Brazilian team featured three defending champions from Beijing, including long jumper Maurren Maggi and freestyle swimmer César Cielo, who both became the nation's first athletes to win gold in their sporting events. Equestrian show jumper Rodrigo Pessoa, and table tennis player Hugo Hoyama became the second and third Brazilian athlete to compete in six Olympic Games. Pessoa, a triple Olympic medalist, was also the nation's flag bearer at the opening ceremony. Meanwhile, three athletes made their fifth Olympic appearance: beach volleyballer and double medalist Emanuel Rego, sailor and multiple-time medalist Robert Scheidt, and football player Formiga. Equestrian eventing rider Serguei Fofanoff, at age 43, was the oldest athlete of the team, while slalom kayaker Ana Sátila was the youngest at age 16.

Other notable Brazilian athletes featured NBA basketball players Leandro Barbosa and Tiago Splitter, taekwondo jin and bronze medalist Natália Falavigna, double New York marathon champion Marílson dos Santos, and medley swimmer and multiple-time Pan American games medalist Thiago Pereira.

The following is the list of number of competitors participating in the Games. Note that reserves in fencing, field hockey, football, and handball are not counted as athletes:

Sport	Men	Women	Total
Archery	1	0	1
Athletics	18	18	36
Basketball	12	12	24
Boxing	7	3	10
Canoeing	2	1	3
Cycling	5	4	9
Diving	2	1	3
Equestrian	9	1	10
Fencing	3	0	3
Football	18	18	36
Gymnastics	3	5	8
Handball	0	14	14
Judo	7	7	14
Modern pentathlon	0	1	1
Rowing	1	3	4
Sailing	5	4	9
Shooting	1	1	2
Swimming	15	5	20
Synchronized swimming	0	2	2
Table tennis	3	3	6
Taekwondo	1	1	2
Tennis	4	0	4
Triathlon	2	1	3
Volleyball	16	16	32
Weightlifting	1	1	2
Wrestling	0	1	1
Total	136	122	258

== Archery ==
Brazil qualified one archer.

Athlete	Event	Ranking round		Round of 64	Round of 32	Round of 16	Quarterfinals	Semifinals	Final / BM	
Athlete	Event	Score	Seed	Opposition Score	Opposition Score	Opposition Score	Opposition Score	Opposition Score	Opposition Score	Rank
Daniel Xavier	Men's individual	653	51	Dobrowolski (POL) (14); L 3–7	did not advance					

== Athletics ==
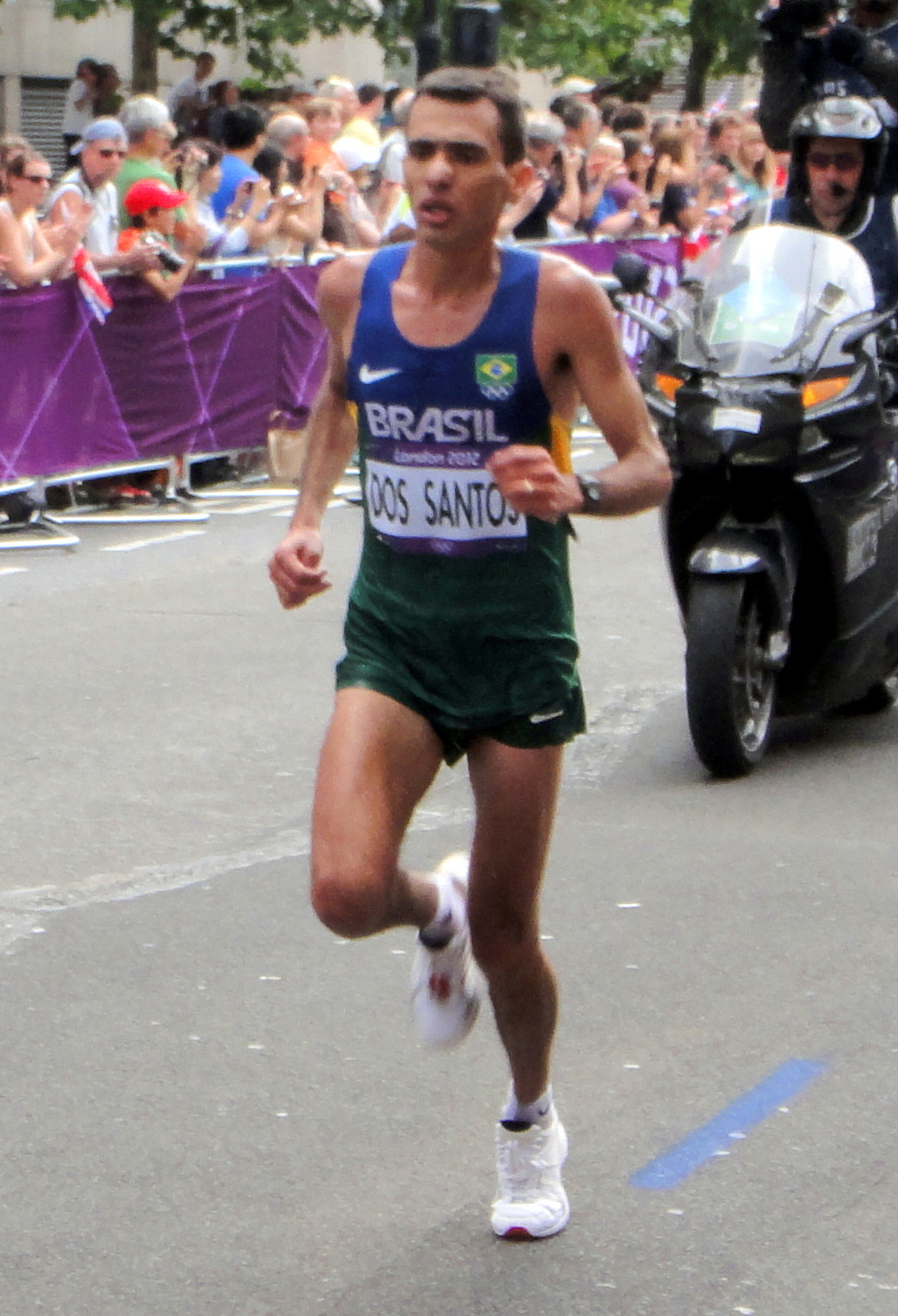
Marílson dos Santos in men's marathon

Brazilian athletes achieved qualifying standards in the following athletics events (up to a maximum of 3 athletes in each event at the 'A Standard, and 1 at the 'B' Standard):

Key

- Note–Ranks given for track events are within the athlete's heat only
- Q = Qualified for the next round
- NR = National record
- N/A = Round not applicable for the event
- Bye = Athlete not required to compete in round
- NM = No mark

Men
Track & road events

Athlete	Event	Heat		Semifinal		Final	
Athlete	Event	Result	Rank	Result	Rank	Result	Rank
Aldemir da Silva Junior	200 m	20.53	2 Q	20.63	5	Did not advance	
Bruno de Barros	200 m	20.52	2 Q	20.55	6	Did not advance	
Sandro Viana	200 m	21.05	7	Did not advance			
Fabiano Peçanha	800 m	1:46.29	2 Q	1:46.29	7	Did not advance	
Kléberson Davide	800 m	DNS		Did not advance			
Caio Bonfim	20 km walk	—N/a				1:24:45	39
Franck de Almeida	Marathon	—N/a				2:13:35	13
Marílson dos Santos	Marathon	—N/a				2:11:10	5
Paulo Roberto Paula	Marathon	—N/a				2:12:17	8
Nilson André; Aldemir da Silva Junior; Bruno de Barros; Carlos Roberto de Morais*; José Carlos Moreira*; Sandro Viana	4 × 100 m relay	38.35	4	—N/a		Did not advance	

* Reserve

Field events

Athlete	Event	Qualification		Final	
Athlete	Event	Distance	Position	Distance	Position
Guilherme Cobbo	High jump	2.21	=16	did not advance	
Fábio Gomes da Silva	Pole vault	NM	—	did not advance	
Mauro Vinícius da Silva	Long jump	8.11	1 Q	8.01	7
Ronald Julião	Discus throw	56.20	41	did not advance	
Jonathan Henrique Silva	Triple jump	15.59	26	did not advance	

Combined events – Decathlon

Athlete	Event	100 m	LJ	SP	HJ	400 m	110H	DT	PV	JT	1500 m	Final	Rank
Luiz Alberto de Araújo	Result	10.70	7.16	13.52	1.93	48.25	14.79	44.76	4.60	51.59	4:38.04	7849	19
Luiz Alberto de Araújo	Points	929	852	699	740	897	875	762	790	612	693	7849	19

Women
Track & road events

Athlete	Event	Heat		Quarterfinal		Semifinal		Final	
Athlete	Event	Result	Rank	Result	Rank	Result	Rank	Result	Rank
Rosângela Santos	100 m	Bye		11.07	2 Q	11.17	3	did not advance	
Ana Cláudia Lemos	200 m	23.40	5	—N/a		did not advance			
Evelyn dos Santos	200 m	22.97	4 Q	—N/a		22.82	7	did not advance	
Geisa Coutinho	400 m	53.43	5	—N/a		did not advance			
Joelma Sousa	400 m	52.69	4	—N/a		did not advance			
Jailma de Lima	400 m hurdles	57.05	8	—N/a		did not advance			
Adriana Aparecida da Silva	Marathon	—N/a						2:33:15	47
Tamiris de Liz*; Evelyn dos Santos; Vanda Gomes*; Franciela Krasucki; Ana Cláudia Lemos; Rosângela Santos	4 × 100 m relay	42.55	4 Q	—N/a				42.91	7
Geisa Coutinho; Jailma de Lima; Aline dos Santos; Joelma Sousa; Lucimar Teodoro*	4 × 400 m relay	3:32.95	7	—N/a				did not advance	

* Reserve

Field events

Athlete	Event	Qualification		Final	
Athlete	Event	Distance	Position	Distance	Position
Geisa Arcanjo	Shot put	18.47	11 Q	19.02	7
Keila Costa	Triple jump	13.84	20	did not advance	
Andressa de Morais	Discus throw	60.94	16	did not advance	
Laila Ferrer e Silva	Javelin throw	58.39	21	did not advance	
Maurren Maggi	Long jump	6.37	15	did not advance	
Fabiana Murer	Pole vault	4.50	15	did not advance	

== Basketball ==
Both Brazil's men and women basketball teams qualified for the events.

- Men's team event – 1 team of 12 players
- Women's team event – 1 team of 12 players

Summary

Team	Event	Group Stage						Quarterfinal	Semifinal	Final / BM	
Team	Event	Opposition Score	Opposition Score	Opposition Score	Opposition Score	Opposition Score	Rank	Opposition Score	Opposition Score	Opposition Score	Rank
Brazil men's	Men's tournament	Australia; W 75-71	Great Britain; W 67–62	Russia; L 74-75	China; W 98-59	Spain; W 88–82	2 Q	Argentina; L 77-82	Did not advance		
Brazil women's	Women's tournament	France; L 73-58	Russia; L 59-69	Australia; L 61–67	Canada; L 73–79	Great Britain; W 78–66	5	Did not advance			

=== Men's tournament ===
Roster

The following is the Brazil roster in the men's basketball tournament of the 2012 Summer Olympics.

Brazil men's national basketball team – 2012 Summer Olympics roster
Players
Coaches

Pos.	No.	Name	Age – Date of birth	Height	Club
G/F	4	Marcelo Machado	37 – 12 April 1975	2.01 m (6 ft 7 in)	CR Flamengo
PG	5	Raul Togni Neto	20 – 19 May 1992	1.85 m (6 ft 1 in)	Lagun Aro GBC
C	6	Caio Torres	25 – 3 June 1987	2.11 m (6 ft 11 in)	CR Flamengo
PG	7	Larry Taylor	31 – 31 October 1980	1.85 m (6 ft 1 in)	Bauru Basketball
G/F	8	Alex Garcia	32 – 4 March 1980	1.91 m (6 ft 3 in)	UniCEUB/BRB
PG	9	Marcelinho Huertas	29 – 25 May 1983	1.91 m (6 ft 3 in)	FC Barcelona Bàsquet
SG	10	Leandro Barbosa	29 – 28 November 1982	1.91 m (6 ft 3 in)	Indiana Pacers
F/C	11	Anderson Varejão	29 – 28 September 1982	2.11 m (6 ft 11 in)	Cleveland Cavaliers
F	12	Guilherme Giovannoni	32 – 2 June 1980	2.04 m (6 ft 8 in)	UniCEUB/BRB
F/C	13	Nenê Hilário	29 – 13 September 1982	2.11 m (6 ft 11 in)	Washington Wizards
F	14	Marcus Vinicius de Souza	28 – 31 May 1984	2.08 m (6 ft 10 in)	CR Flamengo
C	15	Tiago Splitter	27 – 1 January 1985	2.11 m (6 ft 11 in)	San Antonio Spurs

Head coach

- Rubén Magnano

Assistant coach(es)

- Fernando Duró
- José Alves Neto
- Demétrius Conrado Ferraciú

Legend

- Club – describes last
  club before the tournament
- Age – describes age
  on 29 July 2012

Group play

Pos	Team	Pld	W	L	PF	PA	PD	Pts	Qualification
1	Russia	5	4	1	400	359	+41	9 (Note: Head-to-head record: Russia 1–0 Brazil)	Quarterfinals
2	Brazil	5	4	1	402	349	+53	9	Quarterfinals
3	Spain	5	3	2	414	394	+20	8 (Note: Head-to-head record: Spain 1–0 Australia)	Quarterfinals
4	Australia	5	3	2	410	373	+37	8	Quarterfinals
5	Great Britain (H)	5	1	4	380	405	−25	6	
6	China	5	0	5	313	439	−126	5	

Source: FIBA archive
Rules for classification: 1) points; 2) head-to-head points; 3) head-to-head goal average; 4) head-to-head number of points scored.
(H) Hosts
Notes:

29 July 2012
11:15

Report

Brazil	75–71	Australia
Scoring by quarter: 19–20, 17–15, 20–14, 19–22
Pts: Barbosa 16; Rebs: three players 7 Asts: Huertas 10		Pts: Mills 20; Rebs: Andersen 8 Asts: Mills, Nielsen 4

Basketball Arena, London
Referees: Guerrino Cerebuch (ITA), Bill Kennedy (USA), Christos Christodoulou (GRE)

31 July 2012
16:45

Report

Great Britain	62–67	Brazil
Scoring by quarter: 11–4, 16–23, 16–21, 19–19
Pts: Mensah-Bonsu, Reinking 13; Rebs: Mensah-Bonsu 12; Asts: Deng 7		Pts: Splitter 21; Rebs: three players 6 Asts: Huertas 8

Basketball Arena, London
Referees: Recep Ankaralı (TUR), Ilija Belošević (SRB), Fernando Sampietro (ARG)

2 August 2012
16:45

Report

Brazil	74–75	Russia
Scoring by quarter: 20–15, 12–25, 21–19, 21–16
Pts: Barbosa 16; Rebs: Nenê 10; Asts: Vinicius 4		Pts: Kirilenko 19; Rebs: Monia, Mozgov 7 Asts: Shved 6

Basketball Arena, London
Referees: José Carrion (PUR), Luigi Lamonica (ITA), Rabah Noujaim (LIB)

4 August 2012
16:45

Report

China	59–98	Brazil
Scoring by quarter: 11–25, 10–17, 17–28, 21–28
Pts: Zhu Fangyu 13; Rebs: Yi Jianlian 6 Asts: Chen Jianghua 2		Pts: Vinicius 14; Rebs: Varejão 13; Asts: Taylor 6

Basketball Arena, London
Referees: Carl Jungebrand (FIN), Borys Ryschyk (UKR), Oļegs Latiševs (LAT)

6 August 2012
20:00

Report

Spain	82–88	Brazil
Scoring by quarter: 26–17, 18–21, 22–19, 16–31
Pts: P. Gasol 25; Rebs: P. Gasol 7 Asts: three players 4		Pts: Barbosa 23; Rebs: Varejão 7 Asts: Huertas 6

Basketball Arena, London
Referees: Pablo Estévez (ARG), Jorge Vázquez (PUR), Robert Lottermoser (GER)

Quarter-final

8 August 2012
20:00

Report

Brazil	77–82	Argentina
Scoring by quarter: 26–23, 14–23, 14–18, 23–18
Pts: Barbosa, Huertas 22; Rebs: Hilário 12; Asts: Huertas 5		Pts: Scola 17; Rebs: Ginóbili 8 Asts: Prigioni 8

North Greenwich Arena, London
Referees: Juan Arteaga (ESP), José Carrion (PUR), Recep Ankaralı (TUR)

=== Women's tournament ===
Roster

The following is the Brazil roster in the women's basketball tournament of the 2012 Summer Olympics.

Brazil women's national basketball team – 2012 Summer Olympics roster
Players
Coaches

Pos.	No.	Name	Age – Date of birth	Height	Club	Ctr.
PG	4	Adriana Moisés Pinto	34 – June 12, 1978	5 ft 7 in (1.7 m)	Pallacanestro Faenza	(Italy)
SG	5	Karla Costa	33 – September 25, 1978	5 ft 9 in (1.75 m)	Americana Basketball	(Brazil)
G/F	6	Patrícia Ferreira	33 – March 21, 1979	6 ft 0 in (1.83 m)	Ourinhos Basquete	(Brazil)
PG	7	Joice Rodrigues	25 – September 9, 1986	5 ft 9 in (1.75 m)	Ourinhos Basquete	(Brazil)
F	9	Franciele Nascimento	24 – October 19, 1987	6 ft 2 in (1.88 m)	Txingudi Saski Balio Elkartea	(Spain)
G/F	10	Silvia Gustavo	30 – May 14, 1982	6 ft 1 in (1.85 m)	Ourinhos Basquete	(Brazil)
F/C	11	Clarissa dos Santos	26 – July 30, 1985	6 ft 2 in (1.88 m)	Ourinhos Basquete	(Brazil)
F/C	12	Damiris Dantas	19 – November 17, 1992	6 ft 3 in (1.91 m)	Minnesota Lynx	(United States)
C	13	Nádia Colhado	23 – February 25, 1989	6 ft 4 in (1.93 m)	Santo André/Semasa	(Brazil)
C	14	Érika de Souza	30 – March 9, 1982	6 ft 5 in (1.96 m)	Atlanta Dream	(United States)
PG	15	Tássia Carcavalli	20 – May 31, 1992	5 ft 9 in (1.75 m)	Americana Basketball	(Brazil)

Head coach

- (Brazil) Luis Cicchetto

Assistant coach(es)

- (Brazil) Cristiano Cedra
- (Brazil) Maria do Carmo Mardegan Ferreira

Legend

- (C) Team captain
- Age – describes age
  on 28 July 2012
- Club – describes last
  club before the tournament
- nat – country of last club

* Iziane Castro Marques was released after indiscipline off the court before the Games. No other athlete has replaced her and the team had only 11 players.

Group play

Pos	Team	Pld	W	L	PF	PA	PD	Pts	Qualification
1	France	5	5	0	356	319	+37	10	Quarterfinals
2	Australia	5	4	1	353	322	+31	9	Quarterfinals
3	Russia	5	3	2	314	308	+6	8	Quarterfinals
4	Canada	5	2	3	328	332	−4	7	Quarterfinals
5	Brazil	5	1	4	329	354	−25	6	
6	Great Britain (H)	5	0	5	327	372	−45	5	

Source: [ FIBA archive]
Rules for classification: 1) points; 2) head-to-head points; 3) head-to-head goal average; 4) head-to-head number of points scored.
(H) Hosts

28 July 2012
20:00

Report

Brazil	58–73	France
Scoring by quarter: 20–16, 14–18, 15–18, 9–21
Pts: de Souza 17; Rebs: Santos 12; Asts: Pinto 5		Pts: Dumerc 23; Rebs: Miyem 7 Asts: Dumerc 5

Basketball Arena, London
Referees: Robert Lottermoser (GER), Rabah Noujaim (LIB), Felicia Grinter (USA)

30 July 2012
16:45

Report

Russia	69–59	Brazil
Scoring by quarter: 19–18, 12–8, 18–17, 20–16
Pts: Belyakova 14; Rebs: Grishaeva 8 Asts: three players 3		Pts: de Souza 15; Rebs: de Souza 18; Asts: Costa 4

Basketball Arena, London
Referees: Guerrino Cerebuch (ITA), Ilija Belošević (SRB), Snehal Bendke (IND)

1 August 2012
14:30

Report

Australia	67–61	Brazil
Scoring by quarter: 15–10, 16–8, 20–22, 16–21
Pts: Jackson 18; Rebs: Cambage 10; Asts: Harrower 5		Pts: Costa 22; Rebs: Dantas 10; Asts: Costa 3

Basketball Arena, London
Referees: Recep Ankarali (TUR), Carl Jungebrand (FIN), Vitalis Gode (KEN)

3 August 2012
14:30

Report

Brazil	73–79	Canada
Scoring by quarter: 8–18, 17–21, 28–16, 20–24
Pts: de Souza 22; Rebs: Rodrigues 4 Asts: de Souza 12		Pts: Pilypaitis, Smith 14; Rebs: Thorburn 8 Asts: Smith 5

Basketball Arena, London
Referees: José Carrion (PUR), Borys Ryschyk (UKR), Carole Delauné (FRA)

5 August 2012
22:15

Report

Great Britain	66–78	Brazil
Scoring by quarter: 19–19, 17–20, 17–25, 13–14
Pts: Stafford 15; Rebs: Stafford 10; Asts: Stafford 4		Pts: Santos 16; Rebs: Santos 13; Asts: Pinto 12

Basketball Arena, London
Referees: Christos Christodoulou (GRE), William Kennedy (USA), Peng Ling (CHN)

== Boxing ==
Brazil qualified boxers for the following events

Men

Athlete	Event	Round of 32	Round of 16	Quarterfinals	Semifinals	Final	
Athlete	Event	Opposition Result	Opposition Result	Opposition Result	Opposition Result	Opposition Result	Rank
Julião Henriques	Flyweight	Pak J-c (PRK); W 12–8	Cintrón (PUR); L 13–18	did not advance			
Robenílson de Jesus	Bantamweight	Shayimov (UZB); W 13–7	Vodopyanov (RUS); W 13–11	Álvarez (CUB); L 11–16	did not advance		
Robson Conceição	Lightweight	Taylor (GBR); L 9–13	did not advance				
Éverton Lopes	Light welterweight	Bye	Iglesias (CUB); L 15–18	did not advance			
Myke Carvalho	Welterweight	Spence (USA); L 10–16	did not advance				
Esquiva Falcão	Middleweight	Bye	Migitinov (AZE); W 24–11	Harcsa (HUN); W 14–10	Ogogo (GBR); W 16–9	Murata (JPN); L 13–14	2nd place, silver medalist(s)
Yamaguchi Falcão	Light heavyweight	Sangwan (IND); W 15–14	Meng Fl (CHN); W 17^{+}–17 DC	Peraza (CUB); W 18–15	Mekhontsev (RUS); L 11–23	Did not advance	3rd place, bronze medalist(s)

Women

Athlete	Event	Round of 16	Quarterfinals	Semifinals	Final	
Athlete	Event	Opposition Result	Opposition Result	Opposition Result	Opposition Result	Rank
Érica Matos	Flyweight	Magliocco (VEN); L 14–15	did not advance			
Adriana Araújo	Lightweight	Khassenova (KAZ); W 16–14	Oubtil (MAR); W 16–12	Ochigava (RUS); L 11–17	Did not advance	3rd place, bronze medalist(s)
Roseli Feitosa	Middleweight	Li Jz (CHN); L 14–19	did not advance			

== Canoeing ==
=== Slalom ===
Brazil qualified boats for the following events

Athlete	Event	Preliminary						Semifinal		Final	
Athlete	Event	Run 1	Rank	Run 2	Rank	Best	Rank	Time	Rank	Time	Rank
Ana Sátila	Women's K-1	179.92	21	110.83	13	110.83	16	did not advance			

=== Sprint ===
Brazil qualified boats for the following events

Athlete	Event	Heats		Semifinals		Finals	
Athlete	Event	Time	Rank	Time	Rank	Time	Rank
Ronílson Oliveira	Men's C-1 200 m	42.216	5 Q	42.560	5 FB	44.586	12
Erlon Silva; Ronílson Oliveira	Men's C-2 1000 m	3:41.014	2 Q	3:42.101	5 FB	3:41.484	10

Qualification Legend: FA = Qualify to final (medal); FB = Qualify to final B (non-medal)

== Cycling ==
Brazil qualified 6 cyclists for the following events

=== Road ===
Men

Athlete	Event	Time	Rank
Murilo Fischer	Road race	5:46:37	31
Magno Nazaret	Road race	did not finish	
Magno Nazaret	Time trial	55:50.77	26
Gregolry Panizo	Road race	did not finish	

Women

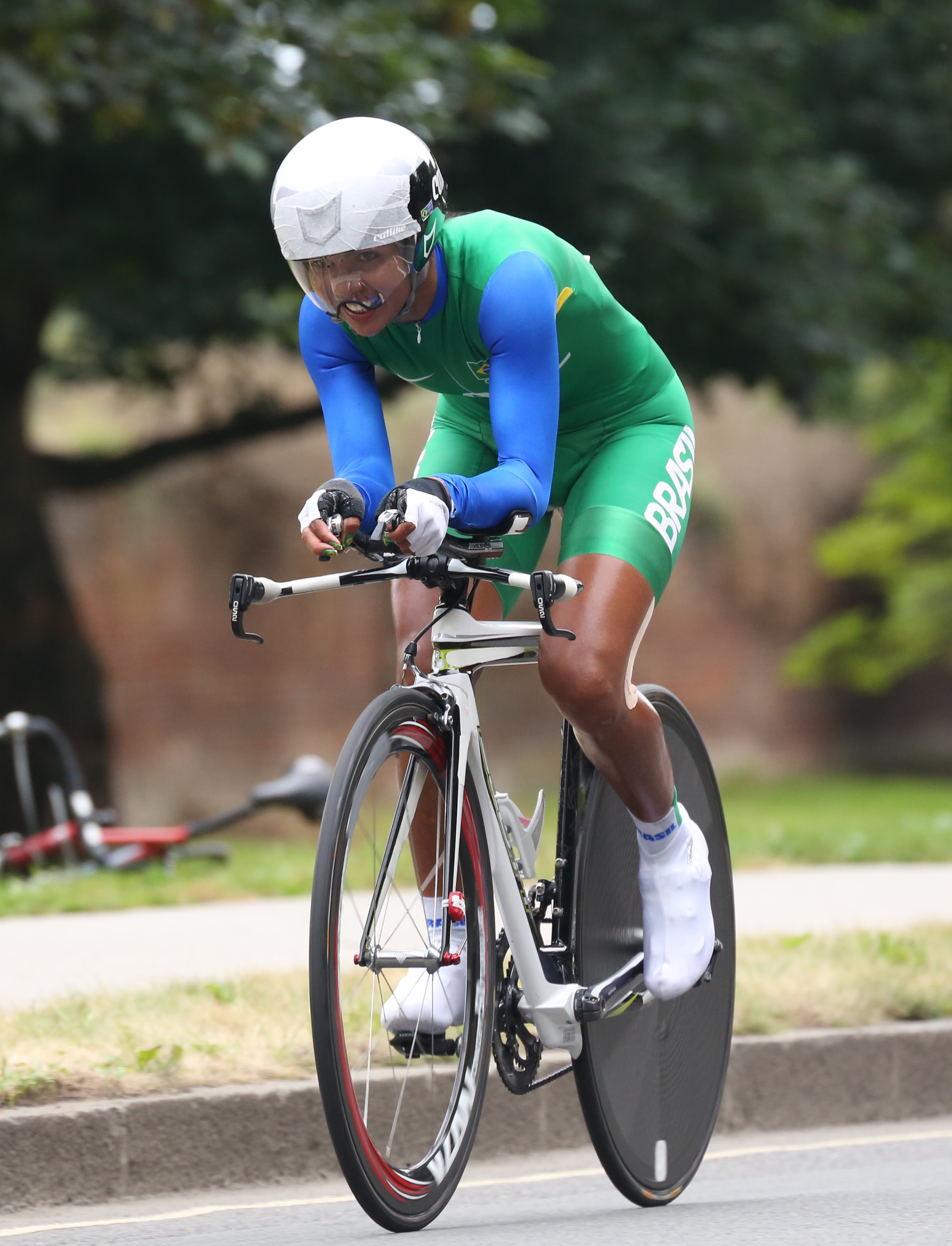
Clemilda Fernandes in women's road time trial

Athlete	Event	Time	Rank
Clemilda Fernandes	Road race	3:35:56	23
Clemilda Fernandes	Time trial	41:25:39	18
Janildes Fernandes	Road race	did not finish	
Fernanda da Silva	Road race	OTL	

=== Mountain biking ===
Athlete	Event	Time	Rank
Rubens Donizete	Men's cross-country	1:34:23	24

=== BMX ===
Athlete	Event	Seeding		Quarterfinal		Semifinal		Final	
Athlete	Event	Result	Rank	Points	Rank	Points	Rank	Result	Rank
Renato Rezende	Men's BMX	38.628	8	36	8	Did not advance			
Squel Stein	Women's BMX	42.995	15	—N/a		28	8	did not advance	

== Diving ==
Brazil qualified three divers for the games.

Men

Athlete	Event	Preliminaries		Semifinals		Final	
Athlete	Event	Points	Rank	Points	Rank	Points	Rank
César Castro	3 m springboard	441.90	14 Q	388.40	17	did not advance	
Hugo Parisi	10 m platform	363.70	30	did not advance			

Women

Athlete	Event	Preliminaries		Semifinals		Final	
Athlete	Event	Points	Rank	Points	Rank	Points	Rank
Juliana Veloso	3 m springboard	241.15	28	did not advance			

== Equestrian ==
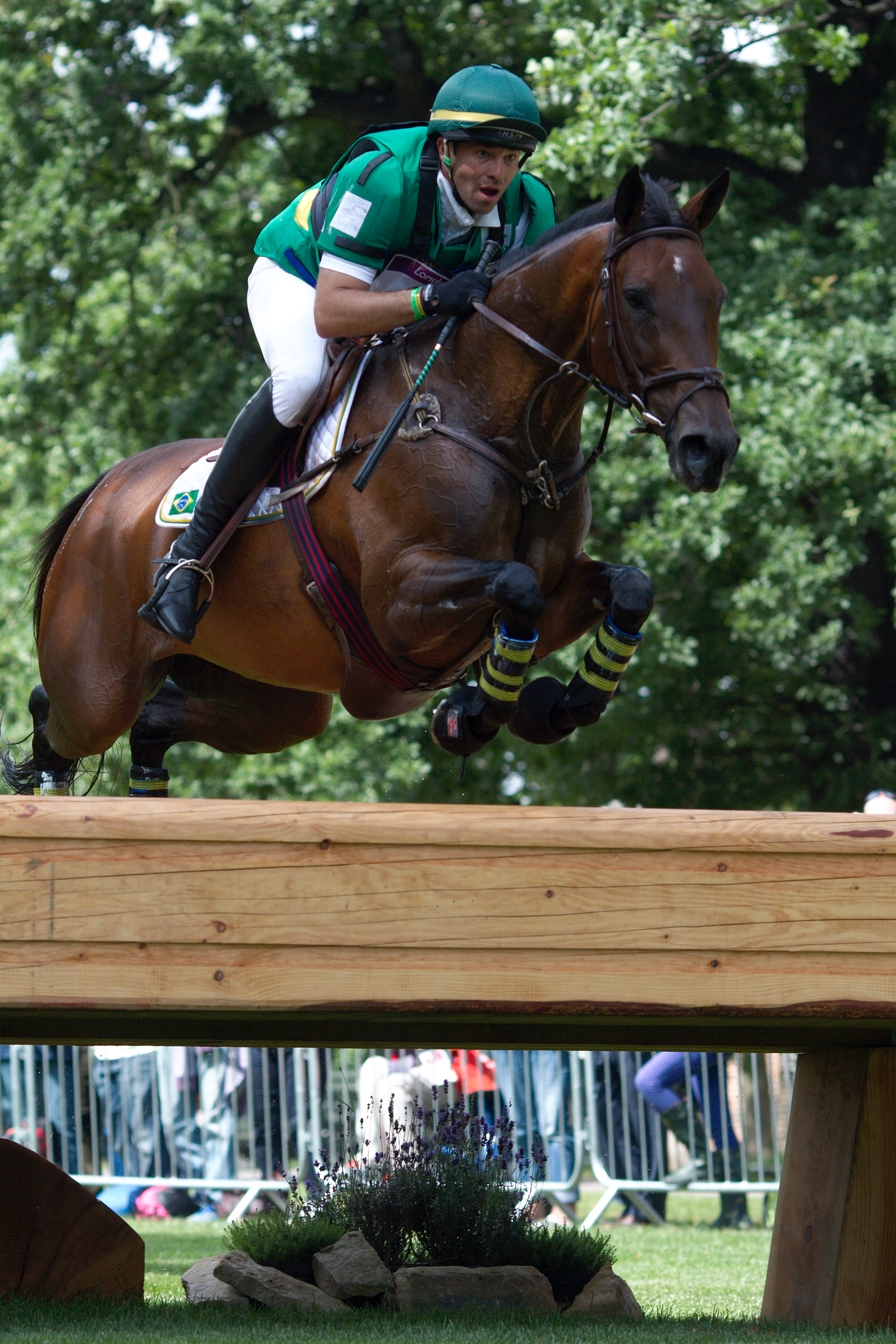
Márcio Jorge riding Josephine during the cross-country phase of the eventing

Brazil qualified the full quota in show jumping. Brazil qualified the full quota in eventing and a single athlete in dressage.

=== Dressage ===
Athlete	Horse	Event	Grand Prix		Grand Prix Special		Grand Prix Freestyle		Overall	
Athlete	Horse	Event	Score	Rank	Score	Rank	Technical	Artistic	Score	Rank
Luiza Almeida	Pastor	Individual	65.866	47	did not advance					

=== Eventing ===
Athlete	Horse	Event	Dressage		Cross-country			Jumping						Total	
Athlete	Horse	Event	Dressage		Cross-country			Qualifier			Final			Total	
Athlete	Horse	Event	Score	Rank	Penalties	Total	Rank	Penalties	Total	Rank	Penalties	Total	Rank	Penalties	Rank
Serguei Fofanoff	Barbara TW	Individual	72.00	73	Eliminated			did not advance							
Ruy Fonseca	Tom Bombadil Too	Individual	53.90	=48	26.40	80.30	45	12.00	92.30	42	did not advance			92.30	42
Márcio Jorge	Josephine MCJ	Individual	58.50	=58	42.80	101.30	50	4.00	105.30	46	did not advance			105.30	46
Marcelo Tosi	Eleda All Black	Individual	58.00	57	29.60	87.60	47	10.00	97.60	44	did not advance			97.60	44
Serguei Fofanoff; Ruy Fonseca; Marcio Jorge; Marcelo Tosi	See above	Team	170.40	13	98.80	269.20	10	26.00	295.20	9	—N/a			295.20	9

=== Jumping ===
Athlete	Horse	Event	Qualification								Final					Total	
Athlete	Horse	Event	Round 1		Round 2			Round 3			Round A		Round B			Total	
Athlete	Horse	Event	Penalties	Rank	Penalties	Total	Rank	Penalties	Total	Rank	Penalties	Rank	Penalties	Total	Rank	Penalties	Rank
Álvaro de Miranda Neto	AD Rahmannshof's Bogeno	Individual	0	=1	0	0	=1 Q	8	8	=11 Q	4	=11 Q	5	9	=12	9	=12
José Roberto Fernandez Filho	Maestro St. Lois	Individual	0	=1	4	4	=17 Q	46	50	45	did not advance						
Rodrigo Pessoa	HH Rebozo	Individual	1	=33	4	5	=27 Q	5	10	25 Q	4	=11 Q	13	17	22	17	22
Carlos Eduardo Ribas	Wilexo	Individual	42	=72	did not advance												
Luiz Francisco de Azevedo*; Álvaro de Miranda Neto; José Roberto Fernandez Filho; Rodrigo Pessoa; Carlos Eduardo Ribas	See above	Team	—N/a								8	=7	59	67	8	67	8

* Reserve

== Fencing ==
Brazil qualified 3 fencers.

Men

Athlete	Event	Round of 64	Round of 32	Round of 16	Quarterfinal	Semifinal	Final / BM	
Athlete	Event	Opposition Score	Opposition Score	Opposition Score	Opposition Score	Opposition Score	Opposition Score	Rank
Athos Schwantes	Individual épée	—N/a	Verwijlen (NED); L 10–15	did not advance				
Guilherme Toldo	Individual foil	Ali (MAR); W 15–6	Imboden (USA); L 5–15	did not advance				
Renzo Agresta	Individual sabre	Bye	Wagner (GER); L 6–15	did not advance				

== Football ==
Both Brazil's men and women football teams qualified for the events.

- Men's team event – 1 team of 18 players
- Women's team event – 1 team of 18 players

Summary

Key:

- A.E.T – After extra time.
- P – Match decided by penalty-shootout.

Team	Event	Group Stage				Quarterfinal	Semifinal	Final / BM	
Team	Event	Opposition Score	Opposition Score	Opposition Score	Rank	Opposition Score	Opposition Score	Opposition Score	Rank
Brazil men's	Men's tournament	Egypt; W 3–2	Belarus; W 3–1	New Zealand; W 3–0	1 Q	Honduras; W 3–2	South Korea; W 3–0	Mexico; L 1–2	2nd place, silver medalist(s)
Brazil women's	Women's tournament	Cameroon; W 5–0	New Zealand; W 1–0	Great Britain; L 0–1	2 Q	Japan; L 0–2	Did not advance		

=== Men's tournament ===
Team roster

The following is the Brazil squad in the men's football tournament of the 2012 Summer Olympics.

Coach: Mano Menezes

No.	Pos.	Player	Date of birth (age)	Caps	Goals	2012 club
1	GK	Gabriel	27 September 1992 (aged 19)	0	0	(Italian Football Federation) Milan
2	DF	Rafael	9 July 1990 (aged 22)	0	0	(The Football Association) Manchester United
3	DF	Thiago Silva* (c)	22 September 1984 (aged 27)	2	0	(French Football Federation) Paris Saint-Germain
4	DF	Juan Jesus	10 June 1991 (aged 21)	0	0	(Italian Football Federation) Internazionale
5	MF	Sandro	15 March 1989 (aged 23)	0	0	(The Football Association) Tottenham Hotspur
6	DF	Marcelo*	12 May 1988 (aged 24)	6	1	(Royal Spanish Football Federation) Real Madrid
7	FW	Lucas Moura	13 August 1992 (aged 19)	0	0	(Brazilian Football Confederation) São Paulo
8	MF	Rômulo	19 September 1990 (aged 21)	0	0	(Russian Football Union) Spartak Moscow
9	FW	Leandro Damião	22 July 1989 (aged 23)	0	0	(Brazilian Football Confederation) Internacional
10	MF	Oscar	9 September 1991 (aged 20)	0	0	(The Football Association) Chelsea
11	FW	Neymar	5 February 1992 (aged 20)	0	0	(Brazilian Football Confederation) Santos
12	FW	Hulk*	25 July 1986 (aged 26)	0	0	(Portuguese Football Federation) Porto
13	DF	Bruno Uvini	3 June 1991 (aged 21)	0	0	(Brazilian Football Confederation) São Paulo
14	DF	Danilo	15 July 1991 (aged 21)	0	0	(Portuguese Football Federation) Porto
15	DF	Alex Sandro	26 January 1991 (aged 21)	0	0	(Portuguese Football Federation) Porto
16	MF	Ganso	12 October 1989 (aged 22)	0	0	(Brazilian Football Confederation) Santos
17	FW	Alexandre Pato	2 September 1989 (aged 22)	4	1	(Italian Football Federation) Milan
18	GK	Neto	19 July 1989 (aged 23)	0	0	(Italian Football Federation) Fiorentina

* Over-aged player.

Group play

Pos	Team	Pld	W	D	L	GF	GA	GD	Pts	Qualification
1	Brazil	3	3	0	0	9	3	+6	9	Advance to knockout stage
2	Egypt	3	1	1	1	6	5	+1	4	Advance to knockout stage
3	Belarus	3	1	0	2	3	6	−3	3	
4	New Zealand	3	0	1	2	1	5	−4	1	

Source: FIFA
Rules for classification: Group stage tiebreakers
26 July 2012
19:45

Brazil	3–2	Egypt
Rafael 16'; Damião 26'; Neymar 30'	Report	Aboutrika 52'; Salah 76'

Millennium Stadium, Cardiff
Attendance: 26,812
Referee: Gianluca Rocchi (Italy)

29 July 2012
15:00

Brazil	3–1	Belarus
Pato 15'; Neymar 65'; Oscar 90+3'	Report	Bressan 8'

Old Trafford, Manchester
Attendance: 66,212
Referee: Yuichi Nishimura (Japan)

1 August 2012
14:30

Brazil	3–0	New Zealand
Danilo 23'; Damião 29'; Sandro 52'	Report

St James' Park, Newcastle
Attendance: 25,201
Referee: Bakary Gassama (Gambia)

Quarter-final

4 August 2012
17:00

Brazil	3–2	Honduras
Damião 38', 60'; Neymar 50' (pen.)	Report	Martínez 12'; Espinoza 48'

St James' Park, Newcastle
Attendance: 42,166
Referee: Felix Brych (Germany)

Semi-final

7 August 2012
19:45

South Korea	0–3	Brazil
	Report	Rômulo 38'; Damião 57', 64'

Old Trafford, Manchester
Attendance: 69,389
Referee: Pavel Královec (Czech Republic)

Gold medal match

11 August 2012
15:00

Brazil	1–2	Mexico
Hulk 90+1'	Report 1 Report 2	Peralta 1', 75'

Wembley Stadium, London
Attendance: 86,162
Referee: Mark Clattenburg (Great Britain)

Final rank
Silver

=== Women's tournament ===
Team roster

Head coach: Jorge Barcellos

Brazil named a squad of 18 players and 4 alternates for the tournament. Prior to the tournament, Elaine withdrew injured and was replaced on 23 July 2012 by Danielli, who was initially selected as an alternate player. Gabi Zanotti subsequently filled the vacant alternate spot.

No.	Pos.	Player	Date of birth (age)	Caps	Goals	Club
1	GK	Andréia	14 September 1977 (aged 34)	77	0	(Brazilian Football Confederation) Juventus
2	FW	Fabiana	4 August 1989 (aged 22)	27	1	(Russian Football Union) WFC Rossiyanka
3	DF	Daiane	15 April 1983 (aged 29)	28	0	(Brazilian Football Confederation) São José
4	DF	Aline	6 July 1982 (aged 30)	50	5	(Russian Football Union) WFC Rossiyanka
5	DF	Érika	4 February 1988 (aged 24)	28	7	(Brazilian Football Confederation) Centro Olímpico
6	FW	Maurine	14 January 1986 (aged 26)	32	4	(Brazilian Football Confederation) Centro Olímpico
7	MF	Ester	9 December 1982 (aged 29)	54	1	(Russian Football Union) WFC Rossiyanka
8	MF	Formiga	3 March 1978 (aged 34)	98	11	(Brazilian Football Confederation) São José
9	FW	Thaís Guedes	20 January 1993 (aged 19)	18	3	(Brazilian Football Confederation) Vitória das Tabocas
10	FW	Marta (captain)	19 February 1986 (aged 26)	68	67	(Swedish Football Association) Tyresö
11	FW	Cristiane	15 May 1985 (aged 27)	74	57	(Russian Football Union) WFC Rossiyanka
12	MF	Rosana	7 July 1982 (aged 30)	83	14	(Brazilian Football Confederation) Centro Olímpico
13	MF	Francielle	18 October 1989 (aged 22)	36	0	(Brazilian Football Confederation) São José
14	MF	Bruna	16 October 1985 (aged 26)	0	0	(Brazilian Football Confederation) Foz Cataratas
15	MF	Danielli	21 January 1987 (aged 25)	9	0	(Brazilian Football Confederation) São José
16	DF	Renata Costa	8 July 1986 (aged 26)	74	7	(Brazilian Football Confederation) Foz Cataratas
17	DF	Grazielle	28 March 1981 (aged 31)	35	7	(Brazilian Football Confederation) Portuguesa
18	GK	Bárbara	4 July 1988 (aged 24)	23	0	(Brazilian Football Confederation) Foz Cataratas

Group play

Pos	Team	Pld	W	D	L	GF	GA	GD	Pts	Qualification
1	Great Britain	3	3	0	0	5	0	+5	9	Qualified for the quarter-finals
2	Brazil	3	2	0	1	6	1	+5	6	Qualified for the quarter-finals
3	New Zealand	3	1	0	2	3	3	0	3	Qualified for the quarter-finals
4	Cameroon	3	0	0	3	1	11	−10	0	

Source: IOC
25 July 2012
18:45

Cameroon	0–5	Brazil
	Report	Francielle 7'; Costa 10'; Marta 73' (pen.), 88'; Cristiane 78'

Millennium Stadium, Cardiff
Attendance: 30,847
Referee: Jenny Palmqvist (Sweden)

28 July 2012
14:30

New Zealand	0–1	Brazil
	Report	Cristiane 86'

Millennium Stadium, Cardiff
Attendance: 30,103
Referee: Bibiana Steinhaus (Germany)

31 July 2012
19:45

Great Britain	1–0	Brazil
Houghton 2'	Report

Wembley Stadium, London
Attendance: 70,584
Referee: Carol Anne Chenard (Canada)

Quarter-final

3 August 2012
17:00

Brazil	0–2	Japan
	Report	Ōgimi 27'; Ohno 73'

Millennium Stadium, Cardiff
Attendance: 28,528
Referee: Kirsi Heikkinen (Finland)

== Gymnastics ==
=== Artistic ===
Brazil qualified 3 men in the individual all-around and qualified a women's team.

Men

Athlete	Event	Qualification								Final							
Athlete	Event	Apparatus						Total	Rank	Apparatus						Total	Rank
Athlete	Event	F	PH	R	V	PB	HB	Total	Rank	F	PH	R	V	PB	HB	Total	Rank
Diego Hypólito	Floor	13.766	—N/a					13.766	59	did not advance							
Sergio Sasaki	All-around	14.533	14.033	14.633	16.200	15.200	14.533	89.132	11 Q	14.233	14.366	14.233	16.100	15.200	14.833	88.965	10
Arthur Zanetti	Rings	—N/a		15.616	—N/a			15.616	4 Q	—N/a		15.900	—N/a			15.900	1st place, gold medalist(s)

Women
Team

Athlete	Event	Qualification						Final					
Athlete	Event	Apparatus				Total	Rank	Apparatus				Total	Rank
Athlete	Event	F	V	UB	BB	Total	Rank	F	V	UB	BB	Total	Rank
Harumi de Freitas	Team	—N/a	12.033	—N/a				did not advance					
Daiane dos Santos	Team	14.166	13.933	12.966	—N/a			did not advance					
Ethiene Franco	Team	13.166	13.566	12.933	13.000	52.665	38	did not advance					
Daniele Hypólito	Team	12.900	14.166	11.900	13.766	52.732	37	did not advance					
Bruna Leal	Team	12.466	12.800	13.433	14.066	52.765	36	did not advance					
Total	Team	40.765	41.765	38.799	39.966	161.295	12	did not advance					

== Handball ==
Brazil qualified for the women's event by winning the 2011 Pan American Games.

- Women's team event – 1 team of 14 players

Summary

Key:

- ET: After Extra Time
- P – Match decided by penalty-shootout.

Team	Event	Group Stage						Quarterfinal	Semifinal	Final / BM	
Team	Event	Opposition Score	Opposition Score	Opposition Score	Opposition Score	Opposition Score	Rank	Opposition Score	Opposition Score	Opposition Score	Rank
Brazil women's	Women's tournament	Croatia; W 24–23	Montenegro; W 27–25	Great Britain; W 30–17	Russia; L 31–27	Angola; W 29–26	1 Q	Norway; L 19–21	Did not advance		6

=== Women's tournament ===
Team roster

The following is the Brazilian roster in the women's handball tournament of the 2012 Summer Olympics.

Head coach: (Denmark) Morten Soubak

No.	Pos.	Name	Date of birth (age)	Height	App.	Goals	Club
1	GK	Chana Masson	18 December 1978 (aged 33)	1.83 m			(Denmark) Randers HK
2	P	Fabiana Diniz	13 May 1981 (aged 31)	1.83 m			(Spain) Bera Bera BM
3	RW	Alexandra do Nascimento	16 September 1981 (aged 30)	1.77 m			(Austria) Hypo
4	LW	Samira Rocha	26 January 1989 (aged 23)	1.70 m			(Austria) Hypo
5	P	Daniela Piedade	2 March 1979 (aged 33)	1.73 m			(Austria) Hypo
8	LW	Fernanda da Silva	25 September 1989 (aged 22)	1.76 m			(Austria) Hypo
9	CB	Ana Paula Belo	18 October 1987 (aged 24)	1.72 m			(Austria) Hypo
10	LW	Jéssica Quintino	17 April 1991 (aged 21)	1.76 m			(Brazil) A.D. Blumenau
15	LB	Silvia Pinheiro	11 January 1981 (aged 31)	1.78 m			(Austria) Hypo
16	GK	Mayssa Pessoa	11 August 1984 (aged 27)	1.80 m			(France) Issy-Paris Hand
18	LB	Eduarda Amorim	23 September 1986 (aged 25)	1.86 m			(Hungary) Győri ETO KC
20	RB	Francine Moraes	1 January 1981 (aged 31)	1.72 m			(Austria) Hypo
22	CB	Mayara Moura	5 December 1986 (aged 25)	1.70 m			(France) Mios Bigamos HB
81	RB	Deonise Cavaleiro	20 June 1983 (aged 29)	1.80 m			(Spain) SD Itxako

Group play

Team	Pld	W	D	L	GF	GA	GD	Pts	Qualification
Brazil	5	4	0	1	137	122	+15	8	Quarter-finals
Croatia	5	4	0	1	145	115	+30	8	Quarter-finals
Russia	5	3	1	1	151	125	+26	7	Quarter-finals
Montenegro	5	2	1	2	137	123	+14	5	Quarter-finals
Angola	5	1	0	4	132	142	−10	2	
Great Britain	5	0	0	5	91	166	−75	0	

28 July 2012; 14:30	Croatia	23 – 24	Brazil	Copper Box, London; Attendance: 3,942; Referees: Bonaventura, Bonaventura (FRA)
28 July 2012; 14:30	Jovetić 6	(10–9)	do Nascimento, Amorim 5	Copper Box, London; Attendance: 3,942; Referees: Bonaventura, Bonaventura (FRA)
28 July 2012; 14:30	3× (yellow card) 4× (suspension)	Report	3× (yellow card) 6× (suspension) 1× (red card)	Copper Box, London; Attendance: 3,942; Referees: Bonaventura, Bonaventura (FRA)

30 July 2012; 19:30	Brazil	27 – 25	Montenegro	Copper Box, London; Attendance: 3,974; Referees: Olesen, Pedersen (DEN)
30 July 2012; 19:30	do Nascimento 8	(15–16)	K. Bulatović 5	Copper Box, London; Attendance: 3,974; Referees: Olesen, Pedersen (DEN)
30 July 2012; 19:30	3× (yellow card) 4× (suspension) 1× (red card)	Report	3× (yellow card) 7× (suspension) 1× (red card)	Copper Box, London; Attendance: 3,974; Referees: Olesen, Pedersen (DEN)

1 August 2012; 16:15	Great Britain	17 – 30	Brazil	Copper Box, London; Attendance: 4,622; Referees: Coulibaly, Diabate (CIV)
1 August 2012; 16:15	Byl, Gerbron 5	(8–17)	Rodrigues 7	Copper Box, London; Attendance: 4,622; Referees: Coulibaly, Diabate (CIV)
1 August 2012; 16:15	2× (yellow card) 3× (suspension)	Report	3× (yellow card) 3× (suspension)	Copper Box, London; Attendance: 4,622; Referees: Coulibaly, Diabate (CIV)

3 August 2012; 16:15	Russia	31 – 27	Brazil	Copper Box, London; Attendance: 4,741; Referees: Lazaar, Reveret (FRA)
3 August 2012; 16:15	Turey 7	(15–14)	Nascimento 9	Copper Box, London; Attendance: 4,741; Referees: Lazaar, Reveret (FRA)
3 August 2012; 16:15	3× (yellow card) 7× (suspension)	Report	2× (yellow card) 2× (suspension)	Copper Box, London; Attendance: 4,741; Referees: Lazaar, Reveret (FRA)

5 August 2012; 11:15	Brazil	29 – 26	Angola	Copper Box, London; Attendance: 4,585; Referees: Bartlett, Stokes (GBR)
5 August 2012; 11:15	three players 5	(14–9)	Kiala 6	Copper Box, London; Attendance: 4,585; Referees: Bartlett, Stokes (GBR)
5 August 2012; 11:15	3× (yellow card) 1× (suspension)	Report	3× (yellow card) 3× (suspension)	Copper Box, London; Attendance: 4,585; Referees: Bartlett, Stokes (GBR)

Quarter-final

7 August 2012; 10:00	Brazil	19 – 21	Norway	Copper Box, London; Attendance: 4,549; Referees: Bonaventura, Bonaventura (FRA)
7 August 2012; 10:00	do Nascimento 5	(13–9)	Koren 5	Copper Box, London; Attendance: 4,549; Referees: Bonaventura, Bonaventura (FRA)
7 August 2012; 10:00	3× (yellow card) 3× (suspension)	Report	2× (yellow card) 1× (suspension)	Copper Box, London; Attendance: 4,549; Referees: Bonaventura, Bonaventura (FRA)

== Judo ==
Men

Athlete	Event	Round of 64	Round of 32	Round of 16	Quarterfinals	Semifinals	Repechage	Final / BM	
Athlete	Event	Opposition Result	Opposition Result	Opposition Result	Opposition Result	Opposition Result	Opposition Result	Opposition Result	Rank
Felipe Kitadai	−60 kg	Bye	Davaadorjyn (MGL); W 0011–0000	Majrashi (KSA); W 0021–0000	Sobirov (UZB); L 0001–0100	Did not advance	Choi G-H (KOR); W 0011–0001	Verde (ITA); W 0011–0000	3rd place, bronze medalist(s)
Leandro Cunha	−66 kg	Bye	Zagrodnik (POL); L 0001–0011	did not advance					
Bruno Mendonça	−73 kg	Bye	Uwase (RWA); W 0100–0000	Elmont (NED); L 0002–0011	did not advance				
Leandro Guilheiro	−81 kg	Bye	Ovčiņņikovs (LAT); W 0010–0002	Attaf (MAR); W 1001–0001	Stevens (USA); L 0000–0101	Did not advance	Nakai (JPN); L 0001–0012	Did not advance	7
Tiago Camilo	−90 kg	—N/a	Hontyuk (UKR); W 1001–0001	Meloni (ITA); W 1011–0001	Choriev (UZB); W 0010–0002	Song D-N (KOR); L 0012–0112	Bye	Iliadis (GRE); L 0000–0001	5
Luciano Corrêa	−100 kg	—N/a	Kone (MLI); W 0102–0002	Grol (NED); L 0003–0101	did not advance				
Rafael Silva	+100 kg	—N/a	Jónsson (ISL); W 0100–0000	Paškevičius (LTU); W 1001–0001	Mikhailine (RUS); L 0001–0001 YUS	Did not advance	Bor (HUN); W 0001–0001 GS	Kim S-M (KOR); W 0011–0002 GS	3rd place, bronze medalist(s)

Women

Athlete	Event	Round of 32	Round of 16	Quarterfinals	Semifinals	Repechage	Final / BM	
Athlete	Event	Opposition Result	Opposition Result	Opposition Result	Opposition Result	Opposition Result	Opposition Result	Rank
Sarah Menezes	−48 kg	Van (VIE); W 0021–0002	Payet (FRA); W 0010–0001	Wu Sg (CHN); W 0011–0002	Van Snick (BEL); W 0010–0000	Bye	Dumitru (ROU); W 0110–0001	1st place, gold medalist(s)
Érika Miranda	−52 kg	Bye	Kim K-O (KOR); L 0001–1012	did not advance				
Rafaela Silva	−57 kg	Roper (GER); W 0021–0002	Karakas (HUN); L 0000-0100	did not advance				
Mariana Silva	−63 kg	Xu L (CHN); L 0001–1012	did not advance					
Maria Portela	−70 kg	Alvear (COL); L 0000–1100	did not advance					
Mayra Aguiar	−78 kg	Bye	Mareghni (TUN); W 0020–0003	Pogorzelec (POL); W 0000–0100	Harrison (USA); L 0000–1010	Bye	Verkerk (NED); W 1000–0000	3rd place, bronze medalist(s)
Maria Suelen Altheman	+78 kg	Mondière (FRA); W 0101–0000	Chikhrouhou (TUN); W 1001–0001	Sugimoto (JPN); L 0100–0000	Did not advance	Issanova (KAZ); W 0111–0002	Tong W (CHN); L 0001–0100 UGR	5

== Modern pentathlon ==
Brazil qualified one athlete.

Athlete	Event	Fencing (épée one touch)			Swimming (200 m freestyle)			Riding (show jumping)			Combined: shooting/running (10 m air pistol)/(3000 m)			Total points	Final rank
Athlete	Event	Results	Rank	MP points	Time	Rank	MP points	Penalties	Rank	MP points	Time	Rank	MP Points	Total points	Final rank
Yane Marques	Women's	21–14	=6	904	2:12.39	6	1212	48	9	1152	12:06.08	12	2072	5340	3rd place, bronze medalist(s)

== Rowing ==
Brazil qualified the following boats.

Men

Athlete	Event	Heats		Repechage		Quarterfinals		Semifinals		Final	
Athlete	Event	Time	Rank	Time	Rank	Time	Rank	Time	Rank	Time	Rank
Anderson Nocetti	Single sculls	7:03.78	4 R	7:07:17	1 QF	7:17.37	6 SC/D	7:54.18	5 FD	7:25.03	19

Women

Athlete	Event	Heats		Repechage		Quarterfinals		Semifinals		Final	
Athlete	Event	Time	Rank	Time	Rank	Time	Rank	Time	Rank	Time	Rank
Kissya Cataldo	Single sculls	8:07.75	4 QF	Bye		8:12.85	6 SC/D	8:01.64	2 FC	DNS	18
Fabiana Beltrame; Luana Bartholo	Lightweight double sculls	7:34.37	6 R	7:27:46	4 FC	—N/a		Bye		7:41.43	13

Qualification Legend: FA=Final A (medal); FB=Final B (non-medal); FC=Final C (non-medal); FD=Final D (non-medal); FE=Final E (non-medal); FF=Final F (non-medal); SA/B=Semifinals A/B; SC/D=Semifinals C/D; SE/F=Semifinals E/F; QF=Quarterfinals; R=Repechage

== Sailing ==
Nine Brazilian sailors qualified to compete in London.

Men

Athlete	Event	Race											Net points	Final rank
Athlete	Event	1	2	3	4	5	6	7	8	9	10	M*	Net points	Final rank
Ricardo Santos	RS:X	14	9	14	21	14	~~22~~	4	10	5	18	10	113	9
Bruno Fontes	Laser	17	2	12	19	10	~~27~~	23	21	16	5	EL	125	13
Jorge Zarif	Finn	15	20	15	20	16	24	14	~~21~~	19	21	EL	161	20
Bruno Prada; Robert Scheidt	Star	4	1	~~9~~	6	2	1	3	5	1	3	14	40	3rd place, bronze medalist(s)

Women

Athlete	Event	Race											Net points	Final rank
Athlete	Event	1	2	3	4	5	6	7	8	9	10	M*	Net points	Final rank
Patrícia Freitas	RS:X	13	13	16	12	13	17	16	~~19~~	2	8	EL	110	14
Adriana Kostiw	Laser Radial	11	15	27	31	25	17	~~42~~	26	30	34	EL	126	25
Ana Barbachan; Fernanda Oliveira	470	11	5	~~14~~	1	6	10	10	9	5	4	14	75	6

M = Medal race; EL = Eliminated – did not advance into the medal race

== Shooting ==
Two Brazilian shooters qualified to compete in London.

Men

Athlete	Event	Qualification		Final	
Athlete	Event	Points	Rank	Points	Rank
Filipe Fuzaro	Double trap	131	17	did not advance	

Women

Athlete	Event	Qualification		Final	
Athlete	Event	Points	Rank	Points	Rank
Ana Luiza Mello	25 m pistol	560	39	did not advance	
Ana Luiza Mello	10 m air pistol	367	43	did not advance	

== Swimming ==
Brazilian swimmers achieved qualifying standards in the following events (up to a maximum of 2 swimmers in each event at the Olympic Qualifying Time (OQT), and 1 at the Olympic Selection Time (OST)): Glauber Silva obtained qualification for 100 m butterfly event but was removed from the Olympic team after drawing doping suspension.

Qualifiers for the latter rounds (Q) of all events were decided on a time only basis, therefore positions shown are overall results versus competitors in all heats.

Men

Athlete	Event	Heat		Semifinal		Final	
Athlete	Event	Time	Rank	Time	Rank	Time	Rank
Bruno Fratus	50 m freestyle	21.82	3 Q	21.63	4 Q	21.61	4
César Cielo	50 m freestyle	21.80	2 Q	21.54	=1 Q	21.59	3rd place, bronze medalist(s)
César Cielo	100 m freestyle	48.67	11 Q	48.17	5 Q	47.92	6
Nicolas Oliveira	100 m freestyle	49.51	24	did not advance			
Daniel Orzechowski	100 m backstroke	55.16	20	did not advance			
Felipe Lima	100 m breaststroke	1:00.57	16 Q	1:00.08	13	did not advance	
Felipe França Silva	100 m breaststroke	1:00.38	15 Q	1:00.01	12	did not advance	
Henrique Barbosa	200 m breaststroke	2:12.05	19	did not advance			
Tales Cerdeira	200 m breaststroke	2:11.05	13 Q	2:09.77	9	did not advance	
Kaio de Almeida	100 m butterfly	53.14	27	did not advance			
Kaio de Almeida	200 m butterfly	1:56.99	=17	did not advance			
Leonardo de Deus	200 m backstroke	1:58.22	16 Q	1:58.14	13	did not advance	
Leonardo de Deus	200 m butterfly	1:58.03	21	did not advance			
Thiago Pereira	200 m individual medley	1:58.31	5 Q	1:57.45	4 Q	1:56.74	4
Thiago Pereira	400 m individual medley	4:12.39	4 Q	—N/a		4:08.86 NR	2nd place, silver medalist(s)
Henrique Rodrigues	200 m individual medley	1:59.37	10 Q	1:59.58	12	did not advance	
César Cielo*; Marcelo Chierighini; João de Lucca*; Bruno Fratus; Nicolas Oliveira; Nicholas Santos	4 × 100 m freestyle relay	3:16:14	9	—N/a		did not advance	
César Cielo*; Marcelo Chierighini; Kaio de Almeida; Felipe Lima*; Daniel Orzechowski*; Thiago Pereira; Felipe França Silva	4 × 100 m medley relay	3:37.00	15	—N/a		did not advance	

* Reserve

Women

Athlete	Event	Heat		Semifinal		Final	
Athlete	Event	Time	Rank	Time	Rank	Time	Rank
Graciele Herrmann	50 m freestyle	25.44	22	did not advance			
Fabíola Molina	100 m backstroke	1:01.40	25	did not advance			
Daynara de Paula	100 m freestyle	55.94	19	did not advance			
Daynara de Paula	100 m butterfly	1:00.14	33	did not advance			
Joanna Melo	200 m butterfly	2:13.17	26	did not advance			
Joanna Melo	200 m individual medley	2:14.26	16 Q	2:14.74	15	did not advance	
Joanna Melo	400 m individual medley	DNS		—N/a		did not advance	
Poliana Okimoto	10 km open water	—N/a				DNF	

== Synchronized swimming ==
Brazil qualified 2 quota places in synchronized swimming.

Athlete	Event	Technical routine		Free routine (preliminary)			Free routine (final)		
Athlete	Event	Points	Rank	Points	Total (technical + free)	Rank	Points	Total (technical + free)	Rank
Lara Teixeira; Nayara Figueira	Duet	87.100	12	87.000	174.100	13	did not advance		

== Table tennis ==
Brazil qualified 6 athletes.

Men

Athlete	Event	Preliminary round	Round 1	Round 2	Round 3	Round 4	Quarterfinals	Semifinals	Final / BM	
Athlete	Event	Opposition Result	Opposition Result	Opposition Result	Opposition Result	Opposition Result	Opposition Result	Opposition Result	Opposition Result	Rank
Hugo Hoyama	Singles	Bye	Wang Z (POL); L 3–4	did not advance						
Gustavo Tsuboi	Singles	Bye	Ghosh (IND); L 2–4	did not advance						
Hugo Hoyama; Thiago Monteiro; Gustavo Tsuboi	Team	—N/a				Hong Kong; L 0–3	did not advance			

Women

Athlete	Event	Preliminary round	Round 1	Round 2	Round 3	Round 4	Quarterfinals	Semifinals	Final / BM	
Athlete	Event	Opposition Result	Opposition Result	Opposition Result	Opposition Result	Opposition Result	Opposition Result	Opposition Result	Opposition Result	Rank
Caroline Kumahara	Singles	Farah (DJI); W 4–0	Parker (GBR); L 0–4	did not advance						
Lígia Silva	Singles	Lulu (VAN); W 4–0	Lay (AUS); L 1–4	did not advance						
Gui Lin; Caroline Kumahara; Lígia Silva	Team	—N/a				South Korea; L 0–3	did not advance			

== Taekwondo ==
Athlete	Event	Round of 16	Quarterfinals	Semifinals	Repechage	Bronze Medal	Final	
Athlete	Event	Opposition Result	Opposition Result	Opposition Result	Opposition Result	Opposition Result	Opposition Result	Rank
Diogo Silva	Men's −68 kg	Kim (UZB); W 3–2 SDP	Abu-Libdeh (JOR); W 7–5	Motamed (IRI); L 5–5 SUP	Bye	Jennings (USA); L 5–8	Did not advance	5
Natália Falavigna	Women's +67 kg	Lee I-J (KOR); L 9–13	did not advance					

== Tennis ==
Brazil qualified four different players in the men's singles and doubles competitions.

Men

Athlete	Event	Round of 64	Round of 32	Round of 16	Quarterfinals	Semifinals	Final / BM	
Athlete	Event	Opposition Score	Opposition Score	Opposition Score	Opposition Score	Opposition Score	Opposition Score	Rank
Thomaz Bellucci	Singles	Tsonga (FRA); L 7–6^{(7–5)}, 4–6, 4–6	did not advance					
Marcelo Melo; Bruno Soares	Doubles	—N/a	Isner / Roddick (USA); W 6–2, 6–4	Berdych / Štěpánek (CZE); W 1–6, 6–4, 24–22	Llodra / Tsonga (FRA); L 4–6, 2–6	did not advance		
Thomaz Bellucci; André Sá	Doubles	—N/a	B. Bryan / M. Bryan (USA); L 6–7^{(5–7)}, 7–6^{(7–5)}, 3–6	did not advance				

== Triathlon ==
Brazils qualified 2 men and 1 woman.

Athlete	Event	Swim (1.5 km)	Trans 1	Bike (40 km)	Trans 2	Run (10 km)	Total Time	Rank
Reinaldo Colucci	Men's	18:56	0:41	58:47	0:28	32:07	1:50:59	36
Diogo Sclebin	Men's	18:10	0:41	59:36	0:31	32:53	1:51:51	44
Pâmella Oliveira	Women's	18:27	0:42	1:08:16	0:36	36:01	2:04:02	30

== Volleyball ==
=== Beach ===
Athlete	Event	Preliminary round	Standing	Round of 16	Quarterfinals	Semifinals	Final / BM	
Athlete	Event	Opposition Score	Standing	Opposition Score	Opposition Score	Opposition Score	Opposition Score	Rank
Alison Cerutti; Emanuel Rego	Men's	Pool A Doppler – Horst (AUT); W 2 – 1 (19–21, 21–17, 16–14); Bellaguarda – Heuscher (SUI); W 2 – 0 (21–17, 21–12); Lupo – Nicolai (ITA); W 2 – 0 (26–24, 21–18)	1 Q	Erdmann – Matysik (GER); W 2 – 0 (21–16, 21–14)	Fijałek – Prudel (POL); W 2 – 1 (21–17, 16–21, 17–15)	Pļaviņš – Šmēdiņš (LAT); W 2 – 0 (21–15, 22–20)	Brink – Reckermann (GER); L 1 – 2 (21–23, 21–16, 14–16)	2nd place, silver medalist(s)
Pedro Cunha; Ricardo Santos	Men's	Pool F Skarlund – Spinnangr (NOR); W 2 – 0 (21–14, 21–18); Garcia Thompson – Grotowski (GBR); W 2 – 0 (21–17, 21–12); Binstock – Reader (CAN); W 2 – 0 (21–18, 24–22)	1 Q	Gavira – Herrera (ESP); W 2 – 0 (21–18, 21–19)	Brink – Reckermann (GER); L 0 – 2 (15–21, 19–21)	did not advance		
Juliana Felisberta; Larissa França	Women's	Pool A Rigobert – Li Yuk Lo (MRI); W 2 – 0 (21–5, 21–10); Holtwick – Semmler (GER); W 2 – 0 (21–18, 21–13); Háječková – Klapalová (CZE); W 2 – 0 (21–12, 21–18)	1 Q	Meppelink – van Gestel (NED); W 2 – 0 (21–10, 21–17)	Goller – Ludwig (GER); W 2 – 0 (21–10, 21–19)	Kessy – Ross (USA); L 1 – 2 (21–15, 19–21, 12–15)	Xue – Zhang (CHN); W 2 – 1 (11–21, 21–19, 15–12)	3rd place, bronze medalist(s)
Maria Antonelli; Talita Antunes	Women's	Pool E Meppelink – van Gestel (NED); W 2 – 0 (21–10, 21–19); Goller – Ludwig (GER); W 2 – 1 (21–19, 29–31, 15–13); Bawden – Palmer (AUS); W 2 – 1 (18–21, 21–16, 15–9)	1 Q	Kolocová – Sluková (CZE); L 1 – 2 (16–21, 22–20, 9–15)	did not advance			

=== Indoor ===
The men's team qualified in third place at the 2011 FIVB Men's World Cup. The women's team secured a berth after winning the South American qualification.

- Men's indoor event – 1 team of 12 players
- Women's indoor event – 1 team of 12 players

Summary

Team	Event	Group Stage						Quarterfinal	Semifinal	Final / BM	
Team	Event	Opposition Score	Opposition Score	Opposition Score	Opposition Score	Opposition Score	Rank	Opposition Score	Opposition Score	Opposition Score	Rank
Brazil men's	Men's tournament	Tunisia; W 3–0	Russia; W 3–0	United States; L 1–3	Serbia; W 3–0	Germany; W 3–0	2 Q	Argentina; W 3–0	Italy; W 3–0	Russia; L 2–3	2nd place, silver medalist(s)
Brazil women's	Women's tournament	Turkey; W 3–2	United States; L 1–3	South Korea; L 0–3	China; W 3–2	Serbia; W 3–0	4 Q	Russia; W 3–2	Japan; W 3–0	United States; W 3–1	1st place, gold medalist(s)

==== Men's tournament ====
Team roster

The following is the Brazilian roster in the men's volleyball tournament of the 2012 Summer Olympics.

Head coach: Bernardo Rezende

No.	Name	Date of birth	Height	Weight	Spike	Block	2012 club
1	Bruno Rezende	2 July 1986	1.90 m (6 ft 3 in)	76 kg (168 lb)	323 cm (127 in)	302 cm (119 in)	(Brazil) RJX
4	Wallace de Souza	26 June 1987	1.98 m (6 ft 6 in)	103 kg (227 lb)	344 cm (135 in)	318 cm (125 in)	(Brazil) Sada Cruzeiro
5	Sidnei Santos	9 July 1982	2.03 m (6 ft 8 in)	98 kg (216 lb)	344 cm (135 in)	318 cm (125 in)	(Brazil) SESI São Paulo
6	Leandro Vissotto Neves	30 April 1983	2.12 m (6 ft 11 in)	97 kg (214 lb)	370 cm (150 in)	345 cm (136 in)	(Italy) Bre Banca Lannutti Cuneo
7	Gilberto Godoy Filho (c)	23 December 1976	1.92 m (6 ft 4 in)	85 kg (187 lb)	325 cm (128 in)	312 cm (123 in)	(Brazil) Cimed/Sky
8	Murilo Endres	3 May 1981	1.90 m (6 ft 3 in)	76 kg (168 lb)	343 cm (135 in)	319 cm (126 in)	(Brazil) SESI São Paulo
10	Sérgio Santos (L)	15 October 1975	1.84 m (6 ft 0 in)	78 kg (172 lb)	325 cm (128 in)	310 cm (120 in)	(Brazil) SESI São Paulo
11	Thiago Alves	26 July 1986	1.94 m (6 ft 4 in)	88 kg (194 lb)	330 cm (130 in)	308 cm (121 in)	(Brazil) RJX
14	Rodrigo Santana	17 April 1979	2.05 m (6 ft 9 in)	85 kg (187 lb)	350 cm (140 in)	328 cm (129 in)	(Brazil) SESI São Paulo
16	Lucas Saatkamp	6 March 1986	2.09 m (6 ft 10 in)	101 kg (223 lb)	340 cm (130 in)	321 cm (126 in)	(Brazil) RJX
17	Ricardo Garcia	17 November 1975	1.91 m (6 ft 3 in)	89 kg (196 lb)	337 cm (133 in)	320 cm (130 in)	(Brazil) Vôlei Futuro
18	Dante Amaral	30 September 1980	2.01 m (6 ft 7 in)	86 kg (190 lb)	345 cm (136 in)	327 cm (129 in)	(Brazil) RJX

Group play

Pos	Team	Pld	W	L	Pts	SW	SL	SR	SPW	SPL	SPR
1	United States	5	4	1	13	14	4	3.500	427	370	1.154
2	Brazil	5	4	1	11	13	5	2.600	418	379	1.103
3	Russia	5	4	1	11	12	5	2.400	408	352	1.159
4	Germany	5	2	3	5	6	11	0.545	379	388	0.977
5	Serbia	5	1	4	5	7	13	0.538	413	455	0.908
6	Tunisia	5	0	5	0	1	15	0.067	294	395	0.744

29 July 2012; 22:20	Brazil	3–0	Tunisia	Earls Court Exhibition Centre, London; Attendance: 10,000; Referees: Ibrahim Al-Naama (QAT), Brian McDougall (GBR)
29 July 2012; 22:20	(25–17, 25–21, 25–18); Results Statistics			Earls Court Exhibition Centre, London; Attendance: 10,000; Referees: Ibrahim Al-Naama (QAT), Brian McDougall (GBR)

31 July 2012; 22:00	Brazil	3–0	Russia	Earls Court Exhibition Centre, London; Attendance: 14,800; Referees: Bela Hobor (HUN), Wang Ning (CHN)
31 July 2012; 22:00	(25–21, 25–23, 25–21); Results Statistics			Earls Court Exhibition Centre, London; Attendance: 14,800; Referees: Bela Hobor (HUN), Wang Ning (CHN)

2 August 2012; 20:00	Brazil	1–3	United States	Earls Court Exhibition Centre, London; Attendance: 11,500; Referees: Frans Loderus (NED), Jose Velez (PUR)
2 August 2012; 20:00	(25–23, 25–27, 19–25, 17–25); Results Statistics			Earls Court Exhibition Centre, London; Attendance: 11,500; Referees: Frans Loderus (NED), Jose Velez (PUR)

4 August 2012; 22:45	Brazil	3–2	Serbia	Earls Court Exhibition Centre, London; Attendance: 11,000; Referees: Wang Ning (CHN), Simone Santi (ITA)
4 August 2012; 22:45	(22–25, 25–15, 20–25, 25–22, 15–9); Results Statistics			Earls Court Exhibition Centre, London; Attendance: 11,000; Referees: Wang Ning (CHN), Simone Santi (ITA)

6 August 2012; 22:00	Brazil	3–0	Germany	Earls Court Exhibition Centre, London; Attendance: 12,000; Referees: Simone Santi (ITA), Karin Zahorcova (CZE)
6 August 2012; 22:00	(25–21, 25–22, 25–19); Results Statistics			Earls Court Exhibition Centre, London; Attendance: 12,000; Referees: Simone Santi (ITA), Karin Zahorcova (CZE)

Quarter-final

8 August 2012; 14:00	Argentina	0–3	Brazil	Earls Court Exhibition Centre, London; Attendance: 11,500; Referees: Andrey Zenovich (RUS), Simone Santi (ITA)
8 August 2012; 14:00	(19–25, 17–25, 20–25); Results Statistics			Earls Court Exhibition Centre, London; Attendance: 11,500; Referees: Andrey Zenovich (RUS), Simone Santi (ITA)

Semi-final

10 August 2012; 19:30	Brazil	3–0	Italy	Earls Court Exhibition Centre, London; Attendance: 14,000; Referees: Akihiko Tano (JPN), Ibrahim Al-Naama (QAT)
10 August 2012; 19:30	(25–21, 25–12, 25–21); Results Statistics			Earls Court Exhibition Centre, London; Attendance: 14,000; Referees: Akihiko Tano (JPN), Ibrahim Al-Naama (QAT)

Gold medal match

12 August 2012; 13:00	Russia	3–2	Brazil	Earls Court Exhibition Centre, London; Attendance: 14,500; Referees: Bela Hobor (HUN), Akihiko Tano (JPN)
12 August 2012; 13:00	(19–25, 20–25, 29–27, 25–22, 15–9); Results Statistics			Earls Court Exhibition Centre, London; Attendance: 14,500; Referees: Bela Hobor (HUN), Akihiko Tano (JPN)

==== Women's tournament ====
Team roster

The following is the Brazilian roster in the women's volleyball tournament of the 2012 Summer Olympics.

Head coach: José Roberto Guimarães

№	Name	Date of birth	Height	Weight	Spike	Block	2012 club
1	Fabiana Claudino (c)	24 January 1985	1.94 m (6 ft 4 in)	76 kg (168 lb)	314 cm (124 in)	293 cm (115 in)	(Turkey) Fenerbahçe
3	Dani Lins	5 January 1985	1.82 m (6 ft 0 in)	68 kg (150 lb)	290 cm (110 in)	276 cm (109 in)	(Brazil) SESI São Paulo
4	Paula Pequeno	22 January 1982	1.84 m (6 ft 0 in)	74 kg (163 lb)	302 cm (119 in)	285 cm (112 in)	(Brazil) Vôlei Futuro
5	Adenízia da Silva	18 December 1986	1.86 m (6 ft 1 in)	63 kg (139 lb)	312 cm (123 in)	290 cm (110 in)	(Brazil) Sollys/Osasco
6	Thaísa Menezes	15 May 1987	1.96 m (6 ft 5 in)	79 kg (174 lb)	316 cm (124 in)	301 cm (119 in)	(Brazil) Sollys/Osasco
8	Jaqueline Carvalho	31 December 1983	1.86 m (6 ft 1 in)	70 kg (150 lb)	302 cm (119 in)	286 cm (113 in)	(Brazil) Sollys/Osasco
9	Fernanda Ferreira	10 January 1980	1.72 m (5 ft 8 in)	66 kg (146 lb)	283 cm (111 in)	264 cm (104 in)	(Azerbaijan) Igtisadchi Baku
11	Tandara Caixeta	30 October 1988	1.85 m (6 ft 1 in)	87 kg (192 lb)	295 cm (116 in)	285 cm (112 in)	(Brazil) Sollys/Osasco
12	Natália Pereira	4 April 1989	1.86 m (6 ft 1 in)	76 kg (168 lb)	300 cm (120 in)	288 cm (113 in)	(Brazil) Unilever
13	Sheilla Castro	1 July 1983	1.86 m (6 ft 1 in)	64 kg (141 lb)	302 cm (119 in)	284 cm (112 in)	(Brazil) Unilever
14	Fabiana de Oliveira (L)	7 March 1980	1.67 m (5 ft 6 in)	59 kg (130 lb)	276 cm (109 in)	266 cm (105 in)	(Brazil) Unilever
16	Fernanda Garay	10 May 1986	1.81 m (5 ft 11 in)	74 kg (163 lb)	308 cm (121 in)	288 cm (113 in)	(Brazil) Vôlei Futuro

Group play

Pos	Team	Pld	W	L	Pts	SW	SL	SR	SPW	SPL	SPR	Qualification
1	United States	5	5	0	15	15	2	7.500	426	345	1.235	Quarter-finals
2	China	5	3	2	9	11	10	1.100	475	461	1.030	Quarter-finals
3	South Korea	5	2	3	8	11	10	1.100	449	452	0.993	Quarter-finals
4	Brazil	5	3	2	7	10	10	1.000	447	420	1.064	Quarter-finals
5	Turkey	5	2	3	6	9	11	0.818	434	443	0.980	
6	Serbia	5	0	5	0	2	15	0.133	297	407	0.730	

28 July 2012; 22:00	Brazil	3–2	Turkey	Earls Court Exhibition Centre, London; Attendance: 8,000; Referees: Andrey Zenovich (RUS), Mitchell Davidson (CAN)
28 July 2012; 22:00	(25–18, 23–25, 25–19, 25–27, 15–12) result statistics			Earls Court Exhibition Centre, London; Attendance: 8,000; Referees: Andrey Zenovich (RUS), Mitchell Davidson (CAN)

30 July 2012; 16:45	United States	3–1	Brazil	Earls Court Exhibition Centre, London; Attendance: 15,000; Referees: Akihiko Tano (JPN), Andrey Zenovich (RUS)
30 July 2012; 16:45	(25–18, 25–17, 22–25, 25–21) result statistics			Earls Court Exhibition Centre, London; Attendance: 15,000; Referees: Akihiko Tano (JPN), Andrey Zenovich (RUS)

1 August 2012; 22:00	Brazil	0–3	South Korea	Earls Court Exhibition Centre, London; Attendance: 11,000; Referees: Mitchell Davidson (CAN), Mitchell Salvatore (USA)
1 August 2012; 22:00	(23–25, 21–25, 21–25) result statistics			Earls Court Exhibition Centre, London; Attendance: 11,000; Referees: Mitchell Davidson (CAN), Mitchell Salvatore (USA)

3 August 2012; 09:30	Brazil	3–2	China	Earls Court Exhibition Centre, London; Attendance: 11,000; Referees: Denny Lassi (DOM), Bela Hobor (HUN)
3 August 2012; 09:30	(25–16, 20–25, 25–18, 28–30, 15–10) result statistics			Earls Court Exhibition Centre, London; Attendance: 11,000; Referees: Denny Lassi (DOM), Bela Hobor (HUN)

5 August 2012; 22:00	Brazil	3–0	Serbia	Earls Court Exhibition Centre, London; Attendance: 8,000; Referees: Karin Zahorcova (CZE), Akihiko Tano (JPN)
5 August 2012; 22:00	(25–10, 25–22, 25–16) result statistics			Earls Court Exhibition Centre, London; Attendance: 8,000; Referees: Karin Zahorcova (CZE), Akihiko Tano (JPN)

Quarter-final

7 August 2012; 15:00	Russia	2–3	Brazil	Earls Court Exhibition Centre, London; Attendance: 11,500; Referees: Akihiko Tano (JPN), Ibrahim Al-Naama (QAT)
7 August 2012; 15:00	(26–24, 22–25, 25–19, 22–25, 19–21) result statistics			Earls Court Exhibition Centre, London; Attendance: 11,500; Referees: Akihiko Tano (JPN), Ibrahim Al-Naama (QAT)

Semi-final

9 August 2012; 19:30	Brazil	3–0	Japan	Earls Court Exhibition Centre, London; Attendance: 13,500; Referees: Simone Santi (ITA), Mohamed Shaaban (EGY)
9 August 2012; 19:30	(25–18, 25–15, 25–18) result statistics			Earls Court Exhibition Centre, London; Attendance: 13,500; Referees: Simone Santi (ITA), Mohamed Shaaban (EGY)

Gold medal match

11 August 2012; 18:30	(gold) Brazil	3–1	United States (silver)	Earls Court Exhibition Centre, London; Attendance: 13,500; Referees: Andrey Zenovich (RUS), Zorica Bjelić (SRB)
11 August 2012; 18:30	(11–25, 25–17, 25–20, 25–17) result statistics			Earls Court Exhibition Centre, London; Attendance: 13,500; Referees: Andrey Zenovich (RUS), Zorica Bjelić (SRB)

== Weightlifting ==
Brazil qualified 1 man and 1 woman.

Athlete	Event	Snatch		Clean & Jerk		Total	Rank
Athlete	Event	Result	Rank	Result	Rank	Total	Rank
Fernando Reis	Men's +105 kg	180	13	220	12	400	12
Jaqueline Ferreira	Women's −75 kg	102	8	128	7	230	8

== Wrestling ==
Brazil qualified in the following event.

Key:

- VT – Victory by Fall.
- PP – Decision by Points – the loser with technical points.
- PO – Decision by Points – the loser without technical points.

Women's freestyle

Athlete	Event	Qualification	Round of 16	Quarterfinal	Semifinal	Repechage 1	Repechage 2	Final / BM	
Athlete	Event	Opposition Result	Opposition Result	Opposition Result	Opposition Result	Opposition Result	Opposition Result	Opposition Result	Rank
Joice Souza da Silva	−55 kg	Bye	Zholobova (RUS); L 0–3 ^{PO}	did not advance					12

== See also ==
- Brazil at the 2011 Pan American Games
- Brazil at the 2012 Winter Youth Olympics
- Brazil at the 2012 Summer Paralympics
