= Gymnastics at the 2012 Summer Olympics – Men's rings =

Olympic gymnastics event

Men's rings at the Games of the XXX Olympiad
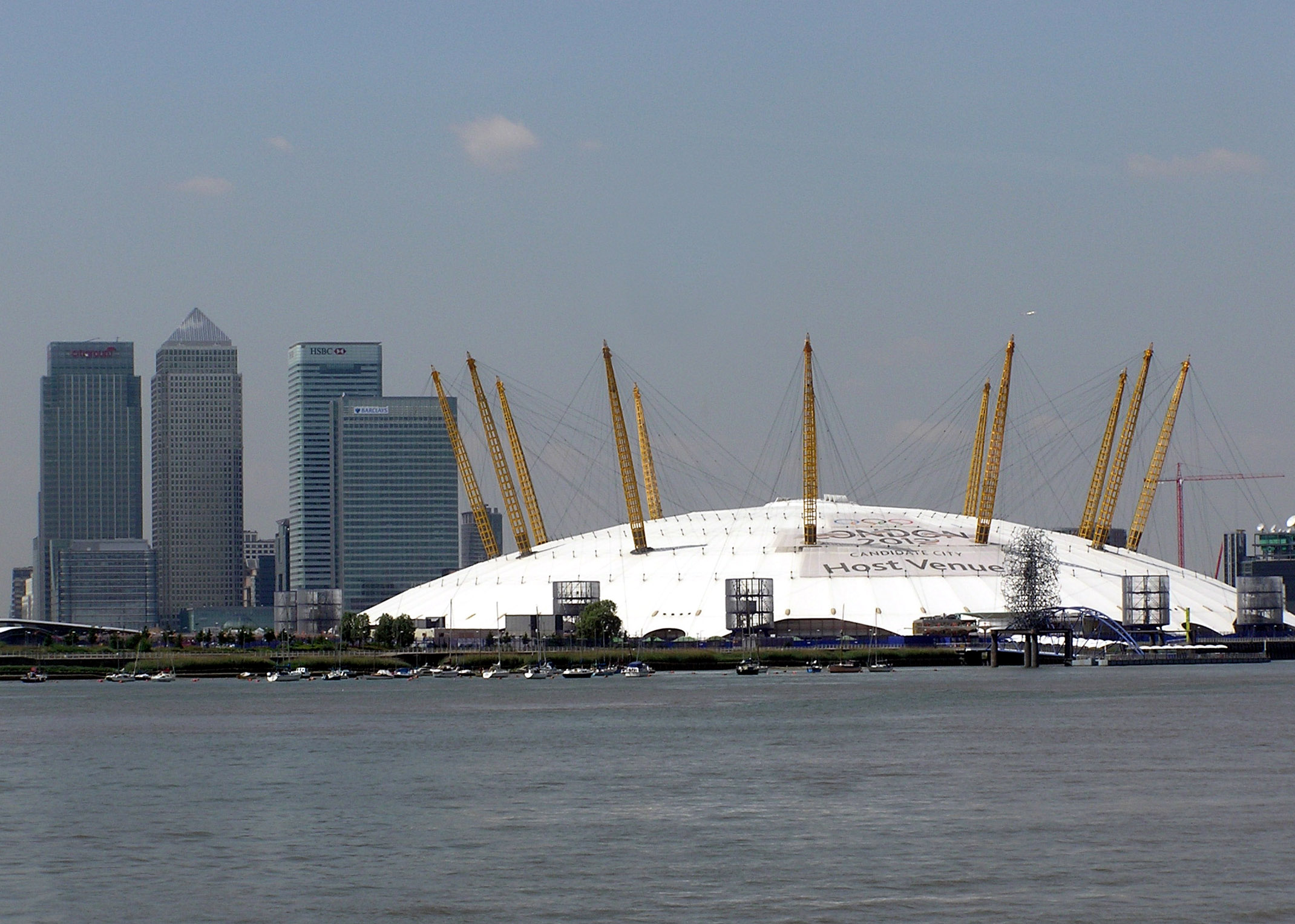
- Canary wharf and dome London
- Venue: North Greenwich Arena 1
- Dates: 28 July 2012(qualifying 6 August 2012(final)
- Competitors: 68 from 31 nations
- Winning score: 15.900

Medalists
1st place, gold medalist(s)		Arthur Zanetti; Brazil
2nd place, silver medalist(s)		Chen Yibing; China
3rd place, bronze medalist(s)		Matteo Morandi; Italy

The men's rings competition at the 2012 Summer Olympics was held at the North Greenwich Arena on 28 July and 6 August 2012. It included 68 competitors from 31 nations.

Arthur Zanetti of Brazil won the gold, his nation's first medal in the event. The 2008 winner, Chen Yibing of China, earned silver to become the 12th man to win multiple medals in the event. Matteo Morandi of Italy took bronze.

== Background ==
This was the 23rd appearance of the event in the Olympics. Three of the eight finalists from 2008 returned: gold medalist Chen Yibing of China, sixth-place finisher (and 2004 finalist) Matteo Morandi of Italy, and eighth-place finisher Yordan Yovchev of Bulgaria. Yovchev was competing in his sixth Olympic Games, a record for a male gymnast; he had previously won a silver medal in 2004 and a bronze medal in 2000. In addition to his 2008 title, Chen was the 2010 and 2011 world champion in the event. Arthur Zanetti of Brazil was the world championship runner-up in 2011.

Azerbaijan and Vietnam each made their debut in the men's rings event. The United States made its 21st appearance, the most of any nation.

== Competition format ==
The top eight competitors in the qualification phase (with a limit of two per country) advanced to the apparatus final. Qualification scores were then erased, with only final-round scores counting.

== Final results ==
Rank	Gymnast	Nation	D Score	E Score	Pen.	Total
1st place, gold medalist(s)	Arthur Zanetti	Brazil	6.800	9.100		15.900
2nd place, silver medalist(s)	Chen Yibing	China	6.800	9.000		15.800
3rd place, bronze medalist(s)	Matteo Morandi	Italy	6.800	8.933		15.733
4	Aleksandr Balandin	Russia	6.700	8.966		15.666
5	Denis Ablyazin	Russia	6.600	9.033		15.633
6	Tommy Ramos	Puerto Rico	6.800	8.800		15.600
7	Yordan Yovchev	Bulgaria	6.600	8.508		15.108
8	Federico Molinari	Argentina	6.700	8.033		14.733
