= Kwak Mi-ran =

South Korean volleyball player (born 1981)

Personal information
- Nationality: South Korean
- Born: 15 July 1981 (age 45)
- Height: 174 cm (5 ft 9 in)
- Weight: 57 kg (126 lb)
- Spike: 291 cm (115 in)
- Block: 282 cm (111 in)

Volleyball information
- Position: Middle Blocker
- Number: 17 (national team)

Career
Years	Teams
2007	Korea Highway Corp

National team
2007	South Korea

Kwak Mi-ran (born 15 July 1981) is a South Korean female volleyball player. She was part of the South Korea women's national volleyball team at the 2007 FIVB Volleyball Women's World Cup.

== Clubs ==
- Korea Highway Corp (2007)
