= Tatiana Kavvadia =

Greek basketball player

Tatiana Kavvadia (born 23 September 1976) is a Greek former basketball player who competed in the 2004 Summer Olympics.
