= Hur Yoon-ja =

South Korean basketball player

- Hangul: 허윤자
- RR: Heo Yunja
- MR: Hŏ Yunja

Hur Yoon-ja (born 19 April 1979) is a Korean former basketball player who competed in the 2004 Summer Olympics.
