= Sonia Blanco =

Spanish former basketball player

Sonia Blanco (born 24 April 1973) is a Spanish former basketball player who competed in the 2004 Summer Olympics.
