= Martin Voráček =

Czech footballer

Personal information
- Date of birth: 21 December 1992 (age 33)
- Place of birth: Czechoslovakia
- Height: 1.86 m (6 ft 1 in)
- Position: Forward

Team information
- Current team: Písek

Senior career*
Years	Team	Apps	(Gls)
2010–	Písek		
2011–2012	→ Slavia Prague (loan)	3	(0)
2012–2013	→ MAS Táborsko (loan)	12	(0)
- * Club domestic league appearances and goals as of 16 March 2013

Martin Voráček (born 21 December 1992) is a Czech football player who currently plays for Písek.

== Club career ==
He made his Gambrinus liga debut for Slavia against Teplice on 22 August 2011.
