= Kim Wielens =

New Zealand basketball player

Kim Wielens (born 25 September 1977) is a New Zealand former basketball player who competed in the 2004 Summer Olympics.
