= Eleni Vasileiou =

Greek basketball player

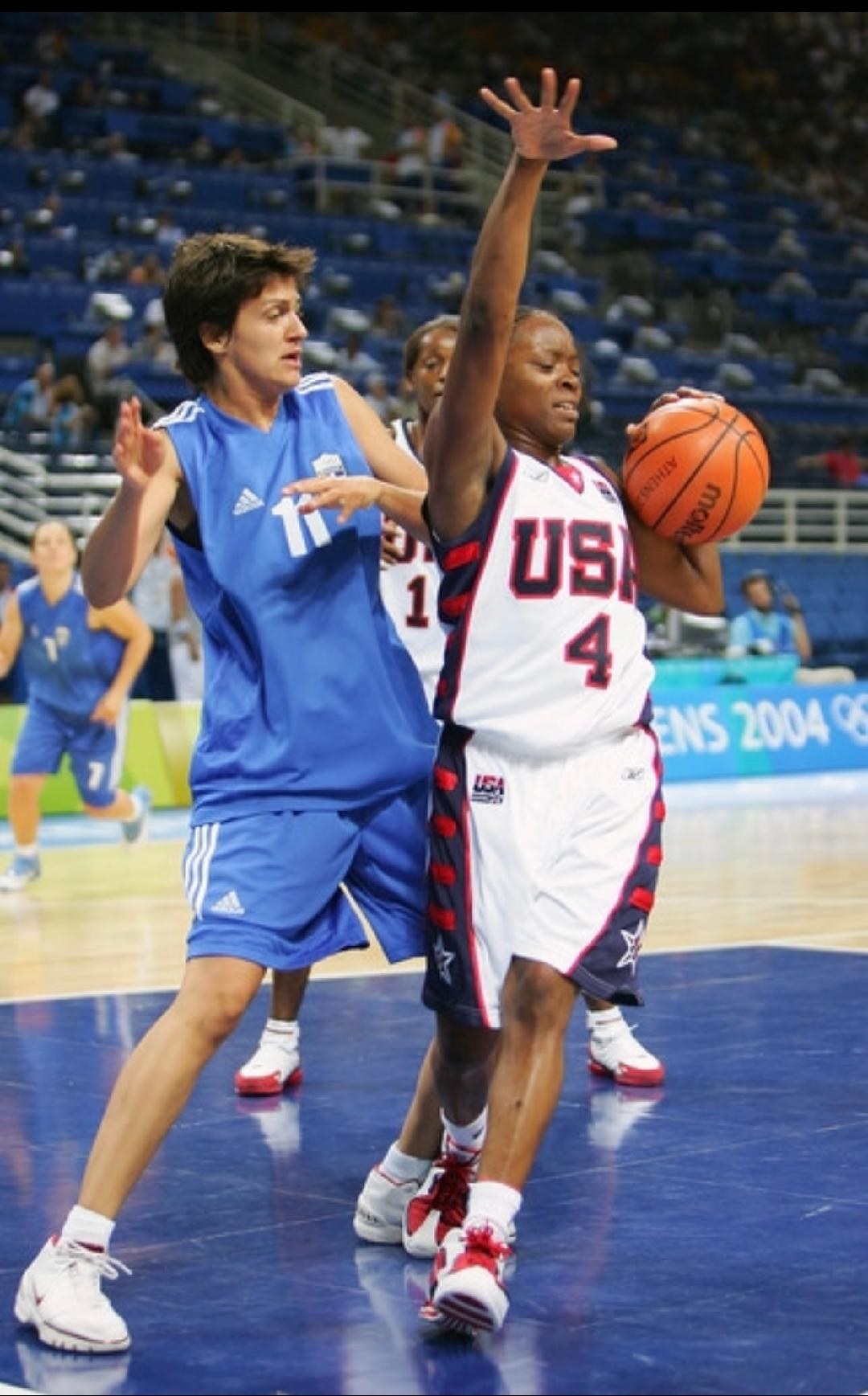
Eleni Vasiliou

Eleni Vasileiou (born 29 July 1974) is a Greek former basketball player who competed in the 2004 Summer Olympics.
