= Eirini Stachtiari =

Greek basketball player

Eirini Stachtiari (born 27 July 1977) is a Greek former basketball player who competed in the 2004 Summer Olympics.
