= Aikaterini Deli =

Greek basketball player

Aikaterini Deli (born 12 January 1975) is a Greek basketball player who competed in the 2004 Summer Olympics.
