= Athina Christoforaki =

Greek basketball player (born 1980)

Athina Christoforaki (born 6 November 1980) is a Greek basketball player who competed in the 2004 Summer Olympics.
