= Karla Costa =

Brazilian basketball player

Karla Cristina Martins da Costa (born September 25, 1978) is a Brazilian women's basketball player. She competed internationally for Brazil at the 2004, 2008 Summer Olympics and 2012 Summer Olympics. She is from Brasília.
