= Ivana Voračková =

Czech basketball player

Ivana Voračková (born 28 August 1979) is a Czech former basketball player who competed in the 2004 Summer Olympics.
