= Jung Mi-ran =

South Korean basketball player

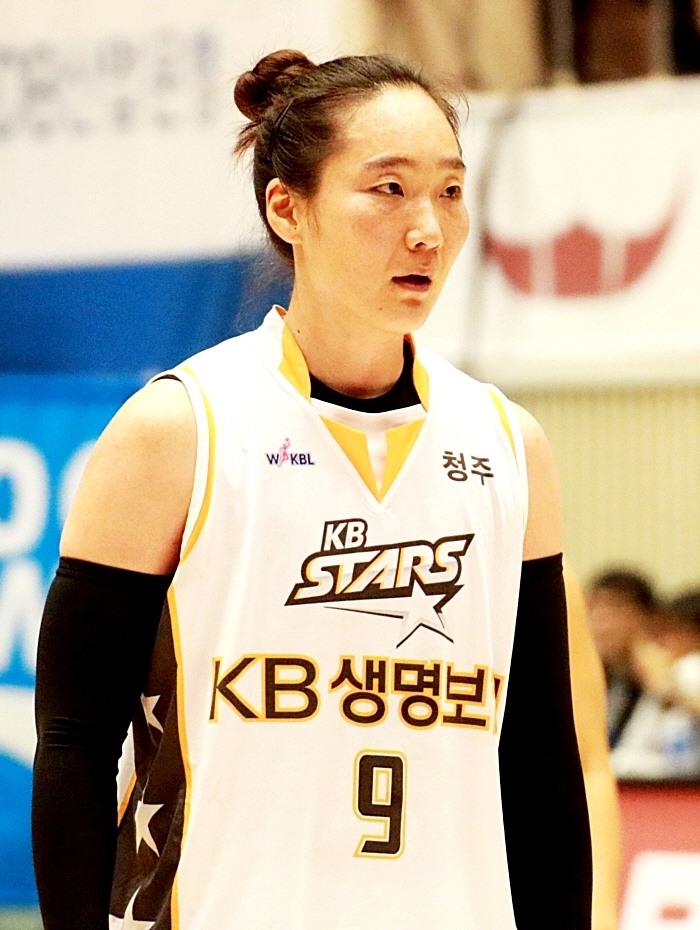
- Jung in her Cheongju KB Stars uniform at a 2016 match against Guri KDB Life Winnus

Korean name
- Hangul: 정미란
- RR: Jeong Miran
- MR: Chŏng Miran

Jung Mi-ran (born 20 March 1985) is a South Korean former basketball player who competed in the 2004 Summer Olympics. She made her Women's Korean Basketball League debut later that year with Guri Kumho Life Insurance, and later played for the Cheongju KB Stars in the same league. In 2017 she was diagnosed with breast cancer, and took time off to recover until 2018. She announced her retirement in 2019.
