= Fencing at the 2004 Summer Olympics – Women's épée =

Women's épée at the Games of the XXVIII Olympiad
- Venue: Helliniko Olympic Complex
- Date: August 15, 2004

These are the results of the women's épée competition in fencing at the 2004 Summer Olympics in Athens. A total of 39 women competed in this event. Competition took place in the Fencing Hall at the Helliniko Olympic Complex on August 15.

== Tournament results ==
=== Preliminary round ===
As there were more than 32 entrants in this event, seven first round matches were held to reduce the field to 32 fencers.

Gómez (CUB)	11—9	Dunette (CAN)
Espinosa (COL)	15—8	Tychler (RSA)
Brânză (ROU)	15—14	Gamir (ALG)
Sidiropoulou (GRE)	walkover	Ndong (SEN)
Kavelaars (CAN)	14—8	Barlow (RSA)
Harada (JPN)	15—6	Wilson (RSA)
Magkandaki (GRE)	15—8	Beer (NZL)

=== Main tournament bracket ===
The remaining field of 32 fencers competed in a single-elimination tournament to determine the medal winners. Semifinal losers proceeded to a bronze medal match.

Round of 32
Nagy (HUN)	15
Sivkova (RUS)	10
Cascioli (ITA)	15
Harada (JPN)	14
Zhang (CHN)	10
Kazimirchuk (UKR)	9
Brânză (ROU)	15
Hormay (HUN)	13
Nisima (FRA)	6
Magkandaki (GRE)	5
Halls (AUS)	15
Lee (KOR)	14
Duplitzer (GER)	15
Kim (KOR)	9
Bokel (GER)	15
Sidiropoulou (GRE)	10
Flessel-Colovic (FRA)	15
Gómez (CUB)	9
Kiraly-Picot (FRA)	11
Shen (CHN)	7
Hristou (GRE)	15
MacKay (CAN)	13
Logounova (RUS)	15
James (USA)	11
Mincza-Nébald (HUN)	15
Tol (NED)	7
Heidemann (GER)	15
Espinosa (COL)	3
Kim (KOR)	9
Ermakova (RUS)	7
Li (CHN)	15
Kavelaars (CAN)	11

Round of 16
Nagy (HUN)	15
Cascioli (ITA)	13
Zhang (CHN)	15
Brânză (ROU)	13
Nisima (FRA)	15
Halls (AUS)	10
Duplitzer (GER)	14
Bokel (GER)	13
Flessel-Colovic (FRA)	15
Kiraly-Picot (FRA)	9
Hristou (GRE)	15
Logounova (RUS)	10
Mincza-Nébald (HUN)	11
Heidemann (GER)	10
Kim (KOR)	14
Li (CHN)	9

Quarterfinals
Nagy (HUN)	8
Zhang (CHN)	7
Nisima (FRA)	15
Duplitzer (GER)	14
Flessel-Colovic (FRA)	15
Hristou (GRE)	13
Mincza-Nébald (HUN)	15
Kim (KOR)	9

Semifinals
Nagy (HUN)	15
Nisima (FRA)	14
Flessel-Colovic (FRA)	15
Mincza-Nébald (HUN)	14

Gold medal final
Nagy (HUN)	15
Flessel-Colovic (FRA)	10
Bronze medal final
Nisima (FRA)	15
Mincza-Nébald (HUN)	12

== Results ==
Rank	Fencer	Country
1st place, gold medalist(s)	Tímea Nagy	Hungary
2nd place, silver medalist(s)	Laura Flessel-Colovic	France
3rd place, bronze medalist(s)	Maureen Nisima	France
4	Ildikó Mincza-Nébald	Hungary
5	Imke Duplitzer	Germany
6	Zhang Li	China
7	Kim Hui-Jeong	South Korea
8	Jeanne Khristou	Greece
9	Li Na	China
10	Britta Heidemann	Germany
11	Cristiana Cascioli	Italy
12	Claudia Bokel	Germany
13	Tatyana Logunova	Russia
14	Evelyn Halls	Australia
15	Hajnalka Kiraly-Picot	France
16	Ana Brânză	Romania
17	Adrienn Hormay	Hungary
18	Sherraine Schalm-MacKay	Canada
19	Anna Sivkova	Russia
20	Oksana Yermakova	Russia
21	Lee Geum-Nam	South Korea
22	Shen Weiwei	China
23	Nadiya Kazimirchuk	Ukraine
24	Sonja Tol	Netherlands
25	Kamara James	United States
26	Kim Mi-jung	South Korea
27	Niki-Katerina Sidiropoulou	Greece
28	Megumi Harada	Japan
29	Ángela María Espinosa	Colombia
30	Monique Kavelaars	Canada
31	Eimey Gómez	Cuba
32	Dimitra Magkanoudaki	Greece
33	Jessica Eliza Beer	New Zealand
34	Catherine Dunnette	Canada
35	Zahra Gamir	Algeria
36	Rachel Barlow	South Africa
37	Natalia Tychler	South Africa
38	Kelly-Anne Wilson	South Africa
39	Aminata Ndong	Senegal
