= Fencing at the 2004 Summer Olympics – Women's team épée =

Women's team épée at the Games of the XXVIII Olympiad
- Venue: Helliniko Olympic Complex
- Date: August 20, 2004

Medalists
1st place, gold medalist(s)		Karina Aznavourian; Oxana Ermakova; Tatiana Logounova; Anna Sivkova	Russia
2nd place, silver medalist(s)		Claudia Bokel; Imke Duplitzer; Britta Heidemann	Germany
3rd place, bronze medalist(s)		Sarah Daninthe; Laura Flessel-Colovic; Hajnalka Kiraly Picot; Maureen Nisima	France

These are the results of the women's épée team competition in fencing at the 2004 Summer Olympics in Athens. A total of 33 women from nine nations competed in this event. Competition took place in the Fencing Hall at the Helliniko Olympic Complex on August 20.

== Tournament results ==
The team competition was a single-elimination tournament among eight teams. Quarterfinal losers continued to play classification matches to determine final placement from first to eighth. Each team match consisted of a set of nine individual matches, comprising a full round-robin schedule among the three fencers on each team.

=== Brackets ===
Quarterfinals
11:25
Russia	37
South Korea	31
11:25
Canada	38
Hungary	37
11:25
Germany	33
Greece	32
11:25
France	45
China	33

Semifinals
12:50
Russia	25
Canada	18
12:50
Germany	33
France	32

Gold medal final
19:50
Russia	34
Germany	28
Bronze medal final
18:30
France	45
Canada	37

Classification matches
12:50
China	29
Greece	18
12:50
Hungary	40
South Korea	33

Fifth place match
14:15
Hungary	32
China	31
Seventh place match
14:15
South Korea	44
Greece	30

=== Preliminary match ===
As there were nine teams in the competition, one preliminary match was held to reduce the field to eight teams. The losing team, South Africa, therefore had a final classification of ninth place in the tournament.

Greece	34 – 15	South Africa
Jeanne Hristou	4 – 2	Natalia Tychler
Dimitra Magkanoudaki	1 – 2	Rachel Barlow
Niki Sidiropoulou	6 – 2	Kelly-Anne Wilson
Dimitra Magkanoudaki	0 – 1	Natalia Tychler
Jeanne Hristou	5 – 3	Kelly-Anne Wilson
Niki Sidiropoulou	5 – 3	Rachel Barlow
Dimitra Magkanoudaki	6 – 2	Kelly-Anne Wilson
Niki Sidiropoulou	2 – 0	Natalia Tychler
Jeanne Hristou	5 – 0	Rachel Barlow

=== Quarterfinals ===
Russia	37 – 31	South Korea
Tatiana Logounova	5 – 3	Lee Keum-Nam
Oxana Ermakova	0 – 2	Kim Hee-Jeong
Anna Sivkova	1 – 0	Kim Mi-Jung
Oxana Ermakova	4 – 3	Lee Keum-Nam
Tatiana Logounova	7 – 8	Kim Mi-Jung
Anna Sivkova	1 – 1	Kim Hee-Jeong
Oxana Ermakova	1 – 2	Kim Mi-Jung
Anna Sivkova	4 – 3	Lee Keum-Nam
Tatiana Logounova	14 – 9	Kim Hee-Jeong

Canada	38 – 37	Hungary
Monique Kavelaars	1 – 3	Ildikó Mincza-Nébald
Sherraine MacKay	3 – 2	Adrienn Hormay
Julie Leprohon	4 – 1	Tímea Nagy
Monique Kavelaars	4 – 4	Adrienn Hormay
Julie Leprohon	6 – 8	Ildikó Mincza-Nébald
Sherraine MacKay	1 – 0	Tímea Nagy
Julie Leprohon	7 – 6	Adrienn Hormay
Monique Kavelaars	3 – 3	Tímea Nagy
Sherraine MacKay	8 – 10	Ildikó Mincza-Nébald

Germany	33 – 32	Greece
Claudia Bokel	0 – 2	Niki Sidiropoulou
Imke Duplitzer	0 – 4	Jeanne Hristou
Britta Heidemann	4 – 4	Dimitra Magkanoudaki
Imke Duplitzer	8 – 7	Niki Sidiropoulou
Claudia Bokel	2 – 1	Dimitra Magkanoudaki
Britta Heidemann	8 – 4	Jeanne Hristou
Imke Duplitzer	3 – 2	Dimitra Magkanoudaki
Britta Heidemann	6 – 7	Niki Sidiropoulou
Claudia Bokel	1 – 1	Jeanne Hristou

France	45 – 33	China
Laura Flessel-Colovic	3 – 2	Li Na
Maureen Nisima	3 – 0	Zhang Li
Hajnalka Kiraly Picot	4 – 0	Shen Weiwei
Laura Flessel-Colovic	8 – 7	Zhang Li
Hajnalka Kiraly Picot	7 – 3	Li Na
Maureen Nisima	5 – 2	Shen Weiwei
Hajnalka Kiraly Picot	5 – 7	Zhang Li
Laura Flessel-Colovic	5 – 6	Shen Weiwei
Maureen Nisima	1 – 6	Li Na

=== Semifinals ===
Russia	25 – 18	Canada
Tatiana Logounova	1 – 0	Monique Kavelaars
Oxana Ermakova	4 – 3	Sherraine MacKay
Anna Sivkova	1 – 3	Julie Leprohon
Oxana Ermakova	3 – 0	Monique Kavelaars
Tatiana Logounova	0 – 2	Julie Leprohon
Anna Sivkova	2 – 1	Sherraine MacKay
Oxana Ermakova	0 – 1	Julie Leprohon
Anna Sivkova	2 – 3	Monique Kavelaars
Tatiana Logounova	12 – 5	Sherraine MacKay

Germany	33 – 32	France
Imke Duplitzer	3 – 0	Maureen Nisima
Claudia Bokel	2 – 3	Laura Flessel-Colovic
Britta Heidemann	2 – 1	Hajnalka Kiraly Picot
Claudia Bokel	1 – 2	Maureen Nisima
Imke Duplitzer	4 – 4	Hajnalka Kiraly Picot
Britta Heidemann	3 – 2	Laura Flessel-Colovic
Claudia Bokel	3 – 4	Hajnalka Kiraly Picot
Britta Heidemann	0 – 1	Maureen Nisima
Imke Duplitzer	14 – 15	Laura Flessel-Colovic

=== Classification matches ===
China	29 – 18	Greece
Shen Weiwei	5 – 2	Niki Sidiropoulou
Zhong Weiping	1 – 6	Jeanne Hristou
Li Na	1 – 0	Dimitra Magkanoudaki
Zhong Weiping	3 – 3	Niki Sidiropoulou
Shen Weiwei	3 – 0	Dimitra Magkanoudaki
Li Na	3 – 1	Jeanne Hristou
Zhong Weiping	2 – 3	Dimitra Magkanoudaki
Li Na	7 – 1	Niki Sidiropoulou
Shen Weiwei	4 – 6	Jeanne Hristou

Hungary	40 – 33	South Korea
Adrienn Hormay	1 – 3	Kim Hee-Jeong
Hajnalka Toth	4 – 3	Lee Keum-Nam
Ildikó Mincza-Nébald	5 – 1	Kim Mi-Jung
Hajnalka Toth	6 – 4	Kim Hee-Jeong
Adrienn Hormay	1 – 2	Kim Mi-Jung
Ildikó Mincza-Nébald	3 – 3	Lee Keum-Nam
Hajnalka Toth	0 – 2	Kim Mi-Jung
Ildikó Mincza-Nébald	0 – 0	Kim Hee-Jeong
Adrienn Hormay	20 – 15	Lee Keum-Nam

=== Seventh place match ===
South Korea	44 – 30	Greece
Kim Hee-Jeong	4 – 4	Niki Sidiropoulou
Go Jung Nam	4 – 1	Jeanne Hristou
Lee Keum-Nam	3 – 1	Dimitra Magkanoudaki
Go Jung Nam	4 – 2	Niki Sidiropoulou
Kim Hee-Jeong	4 – 4	Dimitra Magkanoudaki
Lee Keum-Nam	3 – 3	Jeanne Hristou
Go Jung Nam	5 – 1	Dimitra Magkanoudaki
Lee Keum-Nam	8 – 9	Niki Sidiropoulou
Kim Hee-Jeong	9 – 5	Jeanne Hristou

=== Fifth place match ===
Hungary	32 – 31	China
Ildikó Mincza-Nébald	2 – 5	Shen Weiwei
Adrienn Hormay	4 – 5	Zhong Weiping
Hajnalka Toth	2 – 2	Li Na
Ildikó Mincza-Nébald	7 – 4	Zhong Weiping
Hajnalka Toth	3 – 1	Shen Weiwei
Adrienn Hormay	3 – 2	Li Na
Hajnalka Toth	2 – 0	Zhong Weiping
Ildikó Mincza-Nébald	3 – 4	Li Na
Adrienn Hormay	5 – 8	Shen Weiwei

=== Bronze medal match ===
France	45 – 37	Canada
Maureen Nisima	4 – 1	Monique Kavelaars
Hajnalka Kiraly Picot	2 – 3	Sherraine MacKay
Laura Flessel-Colovic	3 – 0	Julie Leprohon
Hajnalka Kiraly Picot	7 – 3	Monique Kavelaars
Maureen Nisima	4 – 1	Julie Leprohon
Laura Flessel-Colovic	10 – 11	Sherraine MacKay
Hajnalka Kiraly Picot	1 – 5	Julie Leprohon
Laura Flessel-Colovic	9 – 7	Monique Kavelaars
Sarah Daninthe	5 – 6	Sherraine MacKay

=== Gold medal match ===
Russia	34 – 28	Germany
Tatiana Logounova	2 – 0	Imke Duplitzer
Karina Aznavourian	2 – 1	Britta Heidemann
Oxana Ermakova	1 – 0	Claudia Bokel
Karina Aznavourian	3 – 0	Imke Duplitzer
Tatiana Logounova	1 – 2	Claudia Bokel
Oxana Ermakova	7 – 6	Britta Heidemann
Karina Aznavourian	1 – 4	Claudia Bokel
Oxana Ermakova	3 – 3	Imke Duplitzer
Tatiana Logounova	14 – 12	Britta Heidemann
