= South Africa at the 2004 Summer Olympics =

- IOC code: RSA
- NOC: South African Sports Confederation and Olympic Committee
- Website: www.sascoc.co.za

in Athens
- Competitors: 106 in 19 sports
- Flag bearer: Mbulaeni Mulaudzi
- Medals Ranked 43rd: Gold 1 Silver 3 Bronze 2 Total 6

Summer Olympics appearances (overview)
- 1904; 1908; 1912; 1920; 1924; 1928; 1932; 1936; 1948; 1952; 1956; 1960; 1964–1988; 1992; 1996; 2000; 2004; 2008; 2012; 2016; 2020; 2024

South Africa competed at the 2004 Summer Olympics in Athens, Greece, from 13 to 29 August 2004. This was the nation's sixteenth overall and fourth consecutive appearance at the Summer Olympics in the post-apartheid era. The South African Sports Confederation and Olympic Committee (SASCOC) sent a total of 106 athletes to the Games, 66 men and 40 women, to compete in 19 sports. Field hockey was the only team-based sport in which South Africa had its representation at these Games. There was only a single competitor in archery, canoeing, diving, artistic and rhythmic gymnastics, judo, sailing, shooting, taekwondo, and wrestling.

The South African team featured four Olympic medalists from Sydney: breaststroke swimmer Terence Parkin, high jumper Hestrie Cloete, discus thrower Frantz Kruger, and hurdler Llewellyn Herbert. Several athletes made their third consecutive Olympic appearance, including freestyle Ryk Neethling and middle distance runner Hezekiél Sepeng, who previously won the silver in Atlanta for the men's 800 metres. Sepeng's fellow runner and teammate Mbulaeni Mulaudzi, a top medal contender on the same event, later became the nation's flag bearer in the opening ceremony.

South Africa left Athens with a remarkable tally of six Olympic medals, one gold, three silver, and two bronze, being considered its most successful Olympics since the 1996 Summer Olympics in Atlanta. The highlight of the South African team at these Games came with a surprising triumph in men's swimming, when Roland Mark Schoeman, Ryk Neethling, Lyndon Ferns, and Darian Townsend held a major upset on the Aussies, Americans, and the Dutch for a new world record and a prestigious gold medal in the 4 × 100 m freestyle relay. Furthermore, Schoeman completed a full set of medals to become the most decorated South African athlete at these Games, adding his silver in the men's 100 m freestyle and bronze in the men's 50 m freestyle. Cloete managed to repeat her silver from Sydney in the women's high jump, while Donovan Cech and Ramon di Clemente claimed a bronze for the first time in men's rowing.

Field hockey players Craig and Natalie Fulton became the first married couple to represent South Africa at the same Olympic Games.

== Medalists ==
Medal	Name	Sport	Event	Date
Gold	Lyndon Ferns; Ryk Neethling; Roland Mark Schoeman; Darian Townsend	Swimming	Men's 4 × 100 m freestyle relay	August 15
Silver	Roland Mark Schoeman	Swimming	Men's 100 m freestyle	August 18
Silver	Mbulaeni Mulaudzi	Athletics	Men's 800 m	August 28
Silver	Hestrie Cloete	Athletics	Women's high jump	August 28
Bronze	Roland Mark Schoeman	Swimming	Men's 50 m freestyle	August 20
Bronze	Donovan Cech; Ramon di Clemente	Rowing	Men's pair	August 21

== Archery ==
One South African archer qualified for the women's individual archery through the African Championships.

Athlete	Event	Ranking round		Round of 64	Round of 32	Round of 16	Quarterfinals	Semifinals	Final / BM	
Athlete	Event	Score	Seed	Opposition Score	Opposition Score	Opposition Score	Opposition Score	Opposition Score	Opposition Score	Rank
Kirstin Jean Lewis	Women's individual	606	52	Banerjee (IND); W 141–131	Sharma (IND); W 157–153	He Y (CHN); L 142–156	Did not advance			

== Athletics ==
South African athletes have so far achieved qualifying standards in the following athletics events (up to a maximum of 3 athletes in each event at the 'A' Standard, and 1 at the 'B' Standard).

Key

- Note–Ranks given for track events are within the athlete's heat only
- Q = Qualified for the next round
- q = Qualified for the next round as a fastest loser or, in field events, by position without achieving the qualifying target
- NR = National record
- N/A = Round not applicable for the event
- Bye = Athlete not required to compete in round

Men
Track & road events

Athlete	Event	Heat		Quarterfinal		Semifinal		Final	
Athlete	Event	Result	Rank	Result	Rank	Result	Rank	Result	Rank
Shaun Bownes	110 m hurdles	13.68	6 q	13.62	6	Did not advance			
Ockert Cilliers	400 m hurdles	49.12	3 Q	—		49.01	6	Did not advance	
Johan Cronje	1500 m	3:40.99	8 q	—		3:44.41	11	Did not advance	
Llewellyn Herbert	400 m hurdles	48.70	4 Q	—		48.57	5	Did not advance	
Leigh Julius	200 m	20.80	6	Did not advance					
Marcus La Grange	400 m	45.95	3	—		Did not advance			
Alwyn Myburgh	400 m hurdles	48.44	2 Q	—		48.21	3 q	49.07	7
Mbulaeni Mulaudzi	800 m	1:45.72	1 Q	—		1:46.09	2 Q	1:44.61	2nd place, silver medalist(s)
Hendrick Ramaala	Marathon	—						DNF	
Ruben Ramolefi	3000 m steeplechase	8:46.17	13	—				Did not advance	
Hezekiél Sepeng	800 m	1:46.82	2 Q	—		1:44.75	4 q	1:45.53	6
Ian Syster	Marathon	—						DNF	
Gert Thys	Marathon	—						2:16:08	16
Ockert Cilliers; Marcus La Grange; Arnaud Malherbe; Hendrick Mokganyetsi	4 × 400 m relay	DNF		—				Did not advance	

Field events

Athlete	Event	Qualification		Final	
Athlete	Event	Distance	Position	Distance	Position
Okkert Brits	Pole vault	5.60	19	Did not advance	
Jacques Freitag	High jump	2.20	=20	Did not advance	
Hannes Hopley	Discus throw	63.89	4 q	62.58	8
Frantz Kruger	Discus throw	62.32	9 q	64.34	5
Burger Lambrechts	Shot put	18.67	34	Did not advance	
Godfrey Khotso Mokoena	Triple jump	16.32	29	Did not advance	
Gerhardus Pienaar	Javelin throw	79.95	14	Did not advance	
Janus Robberts	Shot put	19.41	21	Did not advance	

Women
Track & road events

Athlete	Event	Heat		Quarterfinal		Semifinal		Final	
Athlete	Event	Result	Rank	Result	Rank	Result	Rank	Result	Rank
Nicolene Cronje	20 km walk	—						1:42:37	47
Surita Febbraio	400 m hurdles	56.49	6	—		Did not advance			
Geraldine Pillay	100 m	11.44	6	Did not advance					
Heide Seyerling	200 m	23.66	5	Did not advance					
Estie Wittstock	400 m	51.89	4 q	—		51.77	6	Did not advance	

Field events

Athlete	Event	Qualification		Final	
Athlete	Event	Distance	Position	Distance	Position
Hestrie Cloete	High jump	1.95	=1 Q	2.02	2nd place, silver medalist(s)
Elizna Naude	Discus throw	58.74	20	Did not advance	
Sunette Viljoen	Javelin throw	54.45	35	Did not advance	

Combined events – Heptathlon

Athlete	Event	100H	HJ	SP	200 m	LJ	JT	800 m	Final	Rank
Janice Josephs	Result	13.69	1.70	12.48	23.37	6.21	41.80	2:18.47	6074	19
Janice Josephs	Points	1023	855	693	1042	915	702	844	6074	19

== Badminton ==
Athlete	Event	Round of 32	Round of 16	Quarterfinal	Semifinal	Final / BM	
Athlete	Event	Opposition Score	Opposition Score	Opposition Score	Opposition Score	Opposition Score	Rank
Chris Dednam	Men's singles	Ponsana (THA); L 1–15, 10–15	Did not advance				
Stewart Carson; Dorian James	Men's doubles	Bach / Han (USA); L 4–15, 1–15	Did not advance				
Michelle Edwards	Women's singles	Popat (IND); L 6–11, 3–11	Did not advance				
Chantal Botts; Michelle Edwards	Women's doubles	Grether / Schenk (GER); L 0–15, 0–15	Did not advance				
Chris Dednam; Antoinette Uys	Mixed doubles	Cheng W-H / Tsai C-H (TPE); L 3–15, 9–15	Did not advance				

== Boxing ==
South Africa sent three boxers to Athens.

Athlete	Event	Round of 32	Round of 16	Quarterfinals	Semifinals	Final	
Athlete	Event	Opposition Result	Opposition Result	Opposition Result	Opposition Result	Opposition Result	Rank
Lodumo Galada	Featherweight	Imranov (AZE); L RSC	Did not advance				
Bongani Mahlangu	Welterweight	Huseynov (AZE); L 14–22	Did not advance				
Khotso Motau	Middleweight	Mashkin (UKR); L 22–25	Did not advance				

== Canoeing ==
=== Sprint ===
Athlete	Event	Heats		Semifinals		Final	
Athlete	Event	Time	Rank	Time	Rank	Time	Rank
Alan van Coller	Men's K-1 500 m	1:40.089	1 q	1:41.131	4	Did not advance	
Alan van Coller	Men's K-1 1000 m	3:32.516	6 q	3:32.893	5	Did not advance	

Qualification Legend: Q = Qualify to final; q = Qualify to semifinal

== Cycling ==
=== Road ===
Athlete	Event	Time	Rank
Ryan Cox	Men's road race	5:50:35	68
Robert Hunter	Men's road race	Did not finish	
Tiaan Kannemeyer	Men's road race	Did not finish	
Anriette Schoeman	Women's road race	3:40:43	55

== Diving ==
South African divers qualified for two individual spots at the 2004 Olympic Games.

Women

Athlete	Event	Preliminaries		Semifinals		Final	
Athlete	Event	Points	Rank	Points	Rank	Points	Rank
Jenna Dreyer	3 m springboard	267.84	17 Q	464.43	17	Did not advance	
Jenna Dreyer	10 m platform	186.90	34	Did not advance			

== Fencing ==
Women

Athlete	Event	Round of 64	Round of 32	Round of 16	Quarterfinal	Semifinal	Final / BM	
Athlete	Event	Opposition Score	Opposition Score	Opposition Score	Opposition Score	Opposition Score	Opposition Score	Rank
Rachel Barlow	Individual épée	Kavelaars (CAN); L 8–14	Did not advance					
Natalia Tychler	Individual épée	Espinosa (COL); L 8–15	Did not advance					
Kelly-Anne Wilson	Individual épée	Harada (JPN); L 6–15	Did not advance					
Rachel Barlow; Natalia Tychler; Kelly-Anne Wilson	Team épée	—		Greece; L 15–34	Did not advance			9

== Field hockey ==
=== Men's tournament ===
Roster

The following is the South African roster in the men's field hockey tournament of the 2004 Summer Olympics.

Head coach: Paul Revington

1. David Staniforth (GK)
4. Craig Jackson (c)
5. Craig Fulton
6. Bruce Jacobs
7. Gregg Clark
8. Iain Evans
9. Emile Smith
10. Jody Paul
13. Steve Evans
14. Eric Rose-Innes
18. Wayne Denne
19. Chris Hibbert (GK)
20. Ian Symons
25. Ryan Ravenscroft
26. Denzil Dolley
27. Greg Nicol

Group play

Pos	Team	Pld	W	D	L	GF	GA	GD	Pts	Qualification
1	Netherlands	5	5	0	0	16	9	+7	15	Semi-finals
2	Australia	5	3	1	1	14	10	+4	10	Semi-finals
3	New Zealand	5	3	0	2	13	11	+2	9	5–8th place semi-finals
4	India	5	1	1	3	11	13	−2	4	5–8th place semi-finals
5	South Africa	5	1	0	4	9	15	−6	3	9–12th place semi-finals
6	Argentina	5	0	2	3	8	13	−5	2	9–12th place semi-finals

Source: FIH

15 August 2004
10:30

Argentina	1 – 2	South Africa
Almada 10'	Report	Nicol 38', 41'

Umpires:
Xavier Adell (ESP)
David Gentles (AUS)

17 August 2004
18:00

South Africa	2 – 4	India
Nicol 7'; Fulton 12'	Report	D. Pillay 27'; B. Singh 41'; D. Tirkey 69'; G. A. Singh 70'

Umpires:
Ray O'Connor (IRL)
David Leiper (GBR)

19 August 2004
08:30

Netherlands	3 – 2	South Africa
Derikx 29'; De Nooijer 49'; Klaver 69'	Report	Evans 17'; Symons 23'

Umpires:
Jason McCracken (NZL)
Han Jin-Soo (KOR)

21 August 2004
18:00

South Africa	2 – 3	Australia
Nicol 4'; Smith 29'	Report	Brooks 17'; Eglington 19'; Brennan 47'

Umpires:
Henrik Ehlers (DEN)
Satinder Kumar (IND)

23 August 2004
08:30

New Zealand	4 – 1	South Africa
Kosoof 15'; Shaw 38', 46'; Burrows 70'	Report	Smith 28'

Umpires:
Christian Blasch (GER)
Sumesh Putra (CAN)

Classification match (9th–12th place)

25 August 2004
08:30

South Africa	5 – 1	Egypt
Nicol 2', 54', 67'; Fulton 7'; Smith 50'	Report	Ahmed 17'

Umpires:
Pedro Teixeira (POR)
Satinder Kumar (IND)

9th place final

27 August 2004
11:30

South Africa	1 – 1 (a.e.t.)	Great Britain
Nicol 45'	Report	Fordham 43'
Penalties
Symons (penalty shoot-out scored); Clark (penalty shoot-out scored); Nicol (penalty shoot-out scored); Denne (penalty shoot-out missed); Fulton (penalty shoot-out missed)	3 – 4	(penalty shoot-out scored) Hawes; (penalty shoot-out scored) Moodie; (penalty shoot-out missed) Stott; (penalty shoot-out scored) Garrard; (penalty shoot-out scored) Hall

Umpires:
David Gentles (AUS)
Amarjit Singh (MAS)

=== Women's tournament ===
Roster

The following is the South African roster in the women's field hockey tournament of the 2004 Summer Olympics.

Head coach: Ros Howell

1. Caroline Birt (GK)
3. Kate Hector
6. Anli Kotze
7. Natalie Fulton
8. Marsha Marescia
10. Johke Koornhof
12. Lindsey Carlisle
14. Kerry Bee
15. Pietie Coetzee
16. Jenny Wilson
24. Fiona Butler
25. Liesel Dorothy
28. Tsoanelo Pholo
30. Sharne Wehmeyer
31. Susan Webber (C)
32. Grazjyna Engelbrecht (GK)

Group play

Pos	Team	Pld	W	D	L	GF	GA	GD	Pts	Qualification
1	Netherlands	4	4	0	0	14	5	+9	12	Semi-finals
2	Germany	4	2	0	2	6	10	−4	6	Semi-finals
3	South Korea	4	1	1	2	9	8	+1	4	
4	Australia	4	1	1	2	6	5	+1	4	
5	South Africa	4	1	0	3	5	12	−7	3	

Source: FIH
Rules for classification: 1) Points; 2) Matches won; 3) Goal difference; 4) Goals for; 5) Head-to-head result.

14 August 2004
08:30

Netherlands	6 – 2	South Africa
Donners 6', 19', 37'; Boomgaardt 15'; Moreira de Melo 23'; Scheepstra 25'	Report	Wilson 7', 53'

Umpires:
Lyn Farrell (NZL)
Gina Spitaleri (ITA)

16 August 2004
10:30

South Africa	0 – 3	Australia
	Report	Towers 28'; Faulkner 34'; Gallagher 59'

Umpires:
Sarah Garnett (NZL)
Ute Conen (GER)

18 August 2004
18:00

South Africa	0 – 3	South Korea
	Report	Ko Kwang-Min 17'; Lee Seon-Ok 35'; Kim Yun-Mi 46'

Umpires:
Jean Duncan (GBR)
Renee Cohen (NED)

20 August 2004
18:00

Germany	0 – 3	South Africa
	Report	Wehmeyer 4'; Coetzee 45'; Wilson 56'

Umpires:
Lyn Farrell (NZL)
Sarah Garnett (NZL)

9th place final

27 August 2004
09:00

Spain	3 – 4 (a.e.t.)	South Africa
Ybarra 23'; Feito 49'; Termens 60'	Report	Coetzee 29'; Pholo 33'; Wilson 47', 73'

Umpires:
Lyn Farrell (NZL)
Minka Woolley (AUS)

== Gymnastics ==
=== Artistic ===
Women

Athlete	Event	Qualification						Final					
Athlete	Event	Apparatus				Total	Rank	Apparatus				Total	Rank
Athlete	Event	V	UB	BB	F	Total	Rank	V	UB	BB	F	Total	Rank
Zandré Labuschagne	All-around	9.012	8.312	8.075	7.525	32.924	60	Did not advance					

=== Rhythmic ===
Athlete	Event	Qualification						Final					
Athlete	Event	Hoop	Ball	Clubs	Ribbon	Total	Rank	Hoop	Ball	Clubs	Ribbon	Total	Rank
Stephanie Sandler	Individual	18.550	18.525	19.100	17.100	73.275	22	Did not advance					

== Judo ==
South Africa has qualified a single judoka.

Athlete	Event	Round of 32	Round of 16	Quarterfinals	Semifinals	Repechage 1	Repechage 2	Repechage 3	Final / BM	
Athlete	Event	Opposition Result	Opposition Result	Opposition Result	Opposition Result	Opposition Result	Opposition Result	Opposition Result	Opposition Result	Rank
Henriette Moller	Women's −63 kg	Bye	Hong O-S (PRK); L 0000–1000	Did not advance						

== Rowing ==
South African rowers qualified the following boats:

Men

Athlete	Event	Heats		Repechage		Semifinals		Final	
Athlete	Event	Time	Rank	Time	Rank	Time	Rank	Time	Rank
Donovan Cech; Ramon di Clemente	Pair	6:57.06	1 SA/B	Bye		6:28.48	3 FA	6:33.40	3rd place, bronze medalist(s)

Qualification Legend: FA=Final A (medal); FB=Final B (non-medal); FC=Final C (non-medal); FD=Final D (non-medal); FE=Final E (non-medal); FF=Final F (non-medal); SA/B=Semifinals A/B; SC/D=Semifinals C/D; SE/F=Semifinals E/F; R=Repechage

== Sailing ==
South African sailors have qualified one boat for each of the following events.

Open

Athlete	Event	Race											Net points	Final rank
Athlete	Event	1	2	3	4	5	6	7	8	9	10	M*	Net points	Final rank
Gareth Blanckenberg	Laser	22	16	~~31~~	13	25	11	10	6	19	8	26	156	17

M = Medal race; OCS = On course side of the starting line; DSQ = Disqualified; DNF = Did not finish; DNS= Did not start; RDG = Redress given

== Shooting ==
Men

Athlete	Event	Qualification		Final	
Athlete	Event	Points	Rank	Points	Rank
Martin Senore	50 m rifle prone	588	39	Did not advance	

== Swimming ==
South African swimmers earned qualifying standards in the following events (up to a maximum of 2 swimmers in each event at the A-standard time, and 1 at the B-standard time):

Men

Athlete	Event	Heat		Semifinal		Final	
Athlete	Event	Time	Rank	Time	Rank	Time	Rank
Eugene Botes	100 m butterfly	54.15	30	Did not advance			
Lyndon Ferns	50 m freestyle	22.53	16 Q	22.46	14	Did not advance	
Ryk Neethling	100 m freestyle	48.85	=2 Q	49.18	7 Q	48.63	4
Terence Parkin	100 m breaststroke	1:03.05	24	Did not advance			
Terence Parkin	200 m breaststroke	2:14.12	12 Q	2:13.58	12	Did not advance	
Roland Mark Schoeman	50 m freestyle	22.41	=8 Q	21.99	1 Q	22.02	3rd place, bronze medalist(s)
Roland Mark Schoeman	100 m freestyle	49.68	13 Q	48.39	1 Q	48.23	2nd place, silver medalist(s)
Darian Townsend	200 m individual medley	2:07.04	37	Did not advance			
Gerhard Zandberg	100 m backstroke	55.62	12 Q	55.76	13	Did not advance	
Lyndon Ferns; Ryk Neethling; Roland Mark Schoeman; Darian Townsend	4 × 100 m freestyle relay	3:13.84	1 Q	—		3:13.17 WR	1st place, gold medalist(s)
Eugene Botes; Terence Parkin; Karl Otto Thaning; Gerhard Zandberg	4 × 100 m medley relay	3:43.94	13	—		Did not advance	

== Taekwondo ==
Athlete	Event	Round of 16	Quarterfinals	Semifinals	Repechage 1	Repechage 2	Final / BM	
Athlete	Event	Opposition Result	Opposition Result	Opposition Result	Opposition Result	Opposition Result	Opposition Result	Rank
Duncan Mahlangu	Men's −68 kg	Sagastume (GUA); L 7–11	Did not advance					

== Triathlon ==
Two South African triathletes qualified for the following events.

Athlete	Event	Swim (1.5 km)	Trans 1	Bike (40 km)	Trans 2	Run (10 km)	Total Time	Rank
Conrad Stoltz	Men's	19:35	0:17	Did not finish				
Megan Hall	Women's	19:39	0:21	1:16:28	0:26	40:19	2:16:26.53	36

== Volleyball ==
=== Beach ===
Athlete	Event	Preliminary round	Standing	Round of 16	Quarterfinals	Semifinals	Final	
Athlete	Event	Opposition Score	Standing	Opposition Score	Opposition Score	Opposition Score	Opposition Score	Rank
Colin Pocock; Gershon Rorich	Men's	Pool F Beligratis – Michalopoulos (GRE); W 2 – 1 (21–16, 24–26, 15–10); Baracetti – Conde (ARG); L 0 – 2 (13–21, 15–21); Brenha – Maia (POR); W 2 – 0 (22–20, 22–20)	2 Q	Prosser – Williams (AUS); L 0 – 2 (14–21, 10–21)	Did not advance			
Leigh Ann Naidoo; Julia Willand	Women's	Pool B Bede – Behar (BRA); L 0 – 2 (7–21, 10–21); Fernández – Larrea (CUB); L 0 – 2 (19–21, 16–21); Gattelli – Perrotta (ITA); L 0 – 2 (18–21, 14–21)	4	Did not advance				

== Wrestling ==
Key:

- VT - Victory by Fall.
- PP - Decision by Points - the loser with technical points.
- PO - Decision by Points - the loser without technical points.

Men's freestyle

Athlete	Event	Elimination Pool			Quarterfinal	Semifinal	Final / BM	
Athlete	Event	Opposition Result	Opposition Result	Rank	Opposition Result	Opposition Result	Opposition Result	Rank
Shaun Williams	−55 kg	Velikov (BUL); L 1–4 ^{SP}	Li Zy (CHN); L 1–3 ^{PP}	3	Did not advance			17

== See also ==
- South Africa at the 2004 Summer Paralympics
