= New Zealand at the 2004 Summer Olympics =

- IOC code: NZL
- NOC: New Zealand Olympic Committee
- Website: www.olympic.org.nz

in Athens
- Competitors: 148 in 18 sports
- Flag bearers: Beatrice Faumuina (opening); Sarah Ulmer (closing)
- Medals Ranked 24th: Gold 3 Silver 2 Bronze 0 Total 5

Summer Olympics appearances (overview)
- 1908; 1912; 1920; 1924; 1928; 1932; 1936; 1948; 1952; 1956; 1960; 1964; 1968; 1972; 1976; 1980; 1984; 1988; 1992; 1996; 2000; 2004; 2008; 2012; 2016; 2020; 2024; 2028

Other related appearances
- Australasia (1908–1912)

New Zealand competed at the 2004 Summer Olympics in Athens, Greece, from 13 to 29 August 2004. This was the nation's twenty-second appearance at the Olympics since its debut in 1908 as part of Australasia. The New Zealand Olympic Committee sent a total of 148 athletes, 81 men, and 67 women to the Games to compete in 18 sports, surpassing a single athlete short of the record from Sydney four years earlier. Basketball and field hockey were the only team-based sports in which New Zealand had its representation at these Olympic Games. There was only a single competitor in archery, boxing, and fencing.

Thirty-four athletes from the New Zealand team had previously competed in Sydney, including Olympic bronze medallist Barbara Kendall in women's Mistral windsurfing, equestrian eventing rider Blyth Tait, sprint kayaker and former breaststroke swimmer Steven Ferguson, table tennis sisters Chunli and Karen Li, and discus thrower Beatrice Faumuina, who was appointed by the committee to carry the New Zealand flag in the opening ceremony. Tait's compatriot Andrew Nicholson participated in his fifth Olympic appearance since the 1984 Summer Olympics in Los Angeles (except 2000, in which he was not chosen), as the most experienced athlete. While Tait shared the same age with Nicholson at 43, and served as the oldest member of the team by a month difference, breaststroke swimmer Annabelle Carey, aged 15, was the youngest ever New Zealand athlete to compete at the Olympics since 1976.

New Zealand left Athens with a total of five Olympic medals, three golds and two silver, finishing twenty-fourth in the overall medal count. Four New Zealand athletes won Olympic gold medals: Hamish Carter in men's triathlon, track cyclist Sarah Ulmer in women's individual pursuit, and twin sisters and rowers Caroline and Georgina Evers-Swindell in women's double sculls.

== Medallists ==
Medal	Name	Sport	Event	Date
Gold	Caroline Evers-Swindell; Georgina Evers-Swindell	Rowing	Women's double sculls	21 August
Gold	Sarah Ulmer	Cycling	Women's individual pursuit	22 August
Gold	Hamish Carter	Triathlon	Men's event	26 August
Silver	Bevan Docherty	Triathlon	Men's event	26 August
Silver	Ben Fouhy	Canoeing	Men's K-1 1000 m	27 August

== Archery ==
One New Zealand archer qualified for the men's individual archery through the 2004 Open New Zealand Championships.

Athlete	Event	Ranking round		Round of 64	Round of 32	Round of 16	Quarterfinals	Semifinals	Final / BM	
Athlete	Event	Score	Seed	Opposition Score	Opposition Score	Opposition Score	Opposition Score	Opposition Score	Opposition Score	Rank
Ken Uprichard	Men's individual	623	54	Liu M-H (TPE); L 145–148	Did not advance					

== Athletics ==
New Zealand athletes have so far achieved qualifying standards in the following athletics events (up to a maximum of 3 athletes in each event at the 'A' Standard, and 1 at the 'B' Standard).

Men
Track & road events

Athlete	Event	Heat		Semifinal		Final	
Athlete	Event	Result	Rank	Result	Rank	Result	Rank
Michael Aish	5000 m	13:50.00	17	—N/a		Did not advance	
Craig Barrett	50 km walk	—N/a				4:06:48	29
John Henwood	10000 m	—N/a				DNF	
Jason Stewart	800 m	1:46.24	5	Did not advance			
Dale Warrender	Marathon	—N/a				2:19:42	33
Nick Willis	1500 m	3:39.80	3 Q	3:41.46	6	Did not advance	
Jonathan Wyatt	Marathon	—N/a				2:17:45	21

Field events

Athlete	Event	Qualification		Final	
Athlete	Event	Distance	Position	Distance	Position
Stuart Farquhar	Javelin throw	74.63	19	Did not advance	

Women
Track & road events

Athlete	Event	Heat		Final	
Athlete	Event	Result	Rank	Result	Rank
Liza Hunter-Galvan	Marathon	—N/a		2:50:23	51
Kim Smith	5000 m	15:31.80	11	Did not advance	

Field events

Athlete	Event	Qualification		Final	
Athlete	Event	Distance	Position	Distance	Position
Valerie Adams	Shot put	18.79	4 Q	18.56	8
Beatrice Faumuina	Discus throw	64.07	5 Q	63.45	6
Melina Hamilton	Pole vault	4.15	=24	Did not advance	

Key

- Note–Ranks given for track events are within the athlete's heat only
- Q = Qualified for the next round
- q = Qualified for the next round as a fastest loser or, in field events, by position without achieving the qualifying target
- NR = National record
- N/A = Round not applicable for the event
- Bye = Athlete not required to compete in round

== Badminton ==
New Zealand nominated a spot in the mixed doubles.

Athlete	Event	Round of 32	Round of 16	Quarterfinal	Semifinal	Final / BM	
Athlete	Event	Opposition Score	Opposition Score	Opposition Score	Opposition Score	Opposition Score	Rank
Sara Petersen; Daniel Shirley	Mixed doubles	Bourret / Julien (CAN); W 15–4, 15–6	Olsen / Rasmussen (DEN); L 14–15, 9–15	Did not advance			

== Basketball ==
=== Men's tournament ===
Roster

The following is the New Zealand roster in the men's basketball tournament of the 2004 Summer Olympics.

New Zealand men's national basketball team – 2004 Summer Olympics roster
Players
Coaches

Pos.	No.	Name	Age – Date of birth	Height	Club	Ctr.
G	4	Mark Dickel	27 – 21 December 1976	1.87 m (6 ft 2 in)	Fenerbahçe	(Turkey)
G/F	5	Pāora Winitana	27 – 6 December 1976	1.96 m (6 ft 5 in)	New Zealand Breakers	(New Zealand)
G	6	Kirk Penney	23 – 23 November 1980	1.96 m (6 ft 5 in)	Auna Gran Canaria	(Spain)
G	7	Paul Henare	25 – 4 March 1979	1.82 m (6 ft 0 in)	New Zealand Breakers	(New Zealand)
G	8	Phill Jones	30 – 25 March 1974	1.97 m (6 ft 6 in)	New Zealand Breakers	(New Zealand)
G	9	Aaron Olson	26 – 11 May 1978	1.95 m (6 ft 5 in)	New Zealand Breakers	(New Zealand)
F	10	Dillon Boucher	28 – 27 December 1975	1.96 m (6 ft 5 in)	New Zealand Breakers	(New Zealand)
F	11	Pero Cameron (C)	30 – 5 June 1974	2.00 m (6 ft 7 in)	New Zealand Breakers	(New Zealand)
F/C	12	Sean Marks	28 – 23 August 1975	2.08 m (6 ft 10 in)	San Antonio Spurs	(United States)
C	14	Ed Book	33 – 23 September 1970	2.10 m (6 ft 11 in)	Nelson Giants	(New Zealand)
C	15	Tony Rampton	28 – 30 May 1976	2.13 m (7 ft 0 in)	Cairns Taipans	(Australia)

Head coach

- (United States) Tab Baldwin

Assistant coach(es)

- (New Zealand) Murray McMahon
- (New Zealand) Nenad Vučinić

Legend

- (C) Team captain
- nat field describes country
  of last club
  before the tournament
- Age as of 13 August 2004

Group play

Pos	Team	Pld	W	L	PF	PA	PD	Pts	Qualification
1	Spain	5	5	0	405	349	+56	10	Quarterfinals
2	Italy	5	3	2	371	341	+30	8 (Note: Head-to-head record: Italy 1–0 Argentina)	Quarterfinals
3	Argentina	5	3	2	414	396	+18	8	Quarterfinals
4	China	5	2	3	303	382	−79	7	Quarterfinals
5	New Zealand	5	1	4	399	413	−14	6 (Note: Head-to-head record: New Zealand 1–0 Serbia and Montenegro)	9th place playoff
6	Serbia and Montenegro	5	1	4	377	388	−11	6	11th place playoff

Source: FIBA archive
Rules for classification: 1) points; 2) head-to-head points; 3) head-to-head goal average; 4) head-to-head number of points scored.
Notes:

15 August 2004
11:15

Italy	71–69	New Zealand
Scoring by quarter: 25–13, 14–9, 17–24, 15–23
Pts: Basile 16; Rebs: Chiacig 9 Asts: Pozzecco 7		Pts: Penney 20; Rebs: Marks 9 Asts: Cameron 5

Helliniko Indoor Arena, Athens
Attendance: 1,100
Referees:
Reynaldo Sanchez (Dominican Republic)
Renato Santos (Brazil)

17 August 2004
9:00

New Zealand	62–69	China
Scoring by quarter: 14–17, 6–12, 25–22, 17–18
Pts: Jones 27; Rebs: Book, Marks 7 each Asts: Dickel 2		Pts: Yao Ming 39; Rebs: Yao Ming 13; Asts: Li Nan, Liu Wei 4 each

Helliniko Indoor Arena, Athens
Attendance: 1,300
Referees:
Christos Christodoulou (Greece)
Virginijus Dovidavicius (Lithuania)

19 August 2004
9:00

Serbia and Montenegro	87–90	New Zealand
Scoring by quarter: 20–22, 24–17, 22–16, 21–35
Pts: Bodiroga 25; Rebs: Bodiroga 6 Asts: Rakočević 2		Pts: Penney 15; Rebs: Marks 5 Asts: Dickel 6

Helliniko Indoor Arena, Athens
Attendance: 4,200
Referees:
Jorge Vazquez (Puerto Rico)
Philippe Leemann (Switzerland)

21 August 2004
14:30

New Zealand	94–98	Argentina
Scoring by quarter: 25–23, 17–24, 29–29, 23–22
Pts: Jones 25; Rebs: Book 6 Asts: Dickel 7		Pts: Scola 25; Rebs: Oberto 9 Asts: Montecchia, Oberto 5 each

Helliniko Indoor Arena, Athens
Attendance: 8,000
Referees: Virginijus Dovidavicius (LTU), Christos Christodoulou (GRE)

23 August 2004
9:00

Spain	88–84	New Zealand
Scoring by quarter: 19–11, 29–26, 25–31, 15–16
Pts: Garbajosa 17; Rebs: Gasol 10; Asts: Calderón 3		Pts: Jones 23; Rebs: Marks 10; Asts: Dickel 5

Helliniko Indoor Arena, Athens
Attendance: 4,252
Referees:
José Carrión (Puerto Rico)
Mike Homsy (Canada)

Classification match (9th–10th place)

24 August 2004
16:45

9th place

New Zealand	80–98	Australia
Scoring by quarter: 15–28, 19–20, 18–26, 28–24
Pts: Jones 26; Rebs: Marks 6 Asts: Dickel 3		Pts: Heal 30; Rebs: Bogut 10; Asts: 3 players, 3 each

Helliniko Indoor Arena, Athens
Attendance: 4,250
Referees: Zoran Šutulović (SCG), Vladimir Okhrimenko (RUS)

=== Women's tournament ===
Roster

The following is the New Zealand roster in the women's basketball tournament of the 2004 Summer Olympics.

New Zealand women's national basketball team – 2004 Summer Olympics roster
Players
Coaches

Pos.	No.	Name	Age – Date of birth	Height	Club	Ctr.
G	4	Leanne Walker (C)	26 – 28 March 1978	1.66 m (5 ft 5 in)	Waikato Lady Titans	(New Zealand)
F	5	Rebecca Cotton	29 – 23 August 1974	1.84 m (6 ft 0 in)	Launceston Tornadoes	(Australia)
G	6	Angela Marino	18 – 3 February 1986	1.66 m (5 ft 5 in)	Adelaide Sturt Sabres	(Australia)
G	7	Kim Wielens	26 – 25 September 1977	1.77 m (5 ft 10 in)	Nelson Sparks	(New Zealand)
G	8	Megan Compain	28 – 18 September 1975	1.75 m (5 ft 9 in)	Rhondda Rebels	(United Kingdom)
F	9	Donna Loffhagen	26 – 29 April 1978	1.85 m (6 ft 1 in)	Otago Breakers	(New Zealand)
C	10	Gina Farmer	29 – 12 December 1974	1.87 m (6 ft 2 in)	NKK Szolnok	(Hungary)
G	11	Tania Tupu	30 – 28 December 1973	1.80 m (5 ft 11 in)	Waikato Lady Titans	(New Zealand)
F/C	12	Sally Farmer	28 – 20 May 1976	1.88 m (6 ft 2 in)	Canterbury Wildcats	(New Zealand)
F	13	Julie Ofsoski	31 – 4 April 1973	1.80 m (5 ft 11 in)	Knox Raiders	(Australia)
F	14	Jody Tini	28 – 10 February 1976	1.79 m (5 ft 10 in)	Waikato Lady Titans	(New Zealand)
F	15	Aneka Kerr	23 – 1 March 1981	1.83 m (6 ft 0 in)	Townsville Fire	(Australia)

Head coach

- (New Zealand) Tom Maher

Assistant coach(es)

- (New Zealand) Kirstin Daly
- (New Zealand) Mike McHugh

Legend

- (C) Team captain
- nat field describes country
  of last club
  before the tournament
- Age as of 13 August 2004

Group play

Pos	Team	Pld	W	L	PF	PA	PD	Pts	Qualification
1	United States	5	5	0	430	285	+145	10	Quarterfinals
2	Spain	5	4	1	368	334	+34	9	Quarterfinals
3	Czech Republic	5	3	2	408	375	+33	8	Quarterfinals
4	New Zealand	5	2	3	321	414	−93	7	Quarterfinals
5	China	5	1	4	360	406	−46	6	
6	South Korea	5	0	5	320	393	−73	5	

Source: FIBA archive
Rules for classification: 1) points; 2) head-to-head points; 3) head-to-head goal average; 4) head-to-head number of points scored.

14 August 2004
14:30

United States	99–47	New Zealand
Scoring by quarter: 28–13, 35–11, 16–15, 20–8
Pts: Cash 19; Rebs: Taurasi 9 Asts: Bird, Staley 3		Pts: Marino 13; Rebs: Loffhagen 7 Asts: Three players 1

Helliniko Indoor Arena, Athens
Attendance: 1,970
Referees:
Vladimir Okhrimenko (Russia)
Abdellilah Chlif (Morocco)

16 August 2004
9:00

New Zealand	81–73	South Korea
Scoring by quarter: 21–11, 16–15, 26–23, 18–24
Pts: G. Farmer 22; Rebs: Loffhagen 14; Asts: Marino 4		Pts: Kim Y. 21; Rebs: Kim Y. 5 Asts: Beon 3

Helliniko Indoor Arena, Athens
Attendance: 180
Referees:
Alejandro Chiti (Argentina)
Tatiana Steigerwald (Brazil)

18 August 2004
22:15

Spain	91–57	New Zealand
Scoring by quarter: 32–8, 13–21, 20–9, 26–19
Pts: Palau 15; Rebs: Cebrián, Pascua 9 Asts: Palau 4		Pts: Marino 21; Rebs: Loffhagen 8 Asts: Loffhagen, Marino 3

Helliniko Indoor Arena, Athens
Attendance: 1,350
Referees:
Elizabeth Sisk (United States)
Shoko Suguro (Japan)

20 August 2004
11:15

New Zealand	79–77	China
Scoring by quarter: 21–19, 14–12, 20–24, 24–22
Pts: G. Farmer 19; Rebs: Kerr 12; Asts: Marino 4		Pts: Sui 21; Rebs: Sui 9 Asts: Wang 2

Helliniko Indoor Arena, Athens
Attendance: 345
Referees:
Elizabeth Sisk (United States)
Nancy Ethier (Canada)

22 August 2004
9:00

New Zealand	57–74	Czech Republic
Scoring by quarter: 12–21, 8–19, 23–18, 14–16
Pts: G. Farmer 19; Rebs: Loffhagen 12; Asts: G. Farmer, Loffhagen 1		Pts: Machová 21; Rebs: Klimešová 10; Asts: Hamzová 7

Helliniko Indoor Arena, Athens
Attendance: 365
Referees:
Nancy Ethier (Canada)
Kim Ja Ok (South Korea)

Quarterfinals

25 August 2004
22:15

Australia	94–55	New Zealand
Scoring by quarter: 26–13, 19–18, 26–13, 23–11
Pts: Jackson 28; Rebs: Snell 10; Asts: Taylor 4		Pts: G. Farmer 15; Rebs: Loffhagen 11; Asts: Four players 2

Olympic Indoor Hall, Athens
Attendance: 8,100
Referees:
Ma Li Jun (China)
Tatiana Steigerwald (Brazil)

Classification match (7th–8th place)

27 August 2004
9:00

7th place

Greece	87–83	New Zealand
Scoring by quarter: 21–24, 22–26, 23–16, 21–17
Pts: Maltsi 29; Rebs: Maltsi, Samoroukova 11; Asts: Kostaki 7		Pts: Loffhagen 23; Rebs: Loffhagen 15; Asts: Loffhagen 3

Olympic Indoor Hall, Athens
Attendance: 6,560
Referees:
José Reyes Ronfini (Mexico)
Shoko Suguro (Japan)

== Boxing ==
New Zealand sent a single boxer to Athens.

Athlete	Event	Round of 32	Round of 16	Quarterfinals	Semifinals	Final	
Athlete	Event	Opposition Result	Opposition Result	Opposition Result	Opposition Result	Opposition Result	Rank
Soulan Pownceby	Light heavyweight	Tarhan (TUR); L RSC	Did not advance				

== Canoeing ==
=== Sprint ===
Athlete	Event	Heats		Semifinals		Final	
Athlete	Event	Time	Rank	Time	Rank	Time	Rank
Steven Ferguson	Men's K-1 500 m	2:06.937	6	Did not advance			
Ben Fouhy	Men's K-1 1000 m	3:26.064	1 Q	Bye		3:27.413	2nd place, silver medalist(s)
Steven Ferguson; Ben Fouhy	Men's K-2 1000 m	3:10.388	2 Q	Bye		3:21.336	8

Qualification Legend: Q = Qualify to final; q = Qualify to semifinal

== Cycling ==
=== Road ===
Men

Athlete	Event	Time	Rank
Heath Blackgrove	Road race	Did not finish	
Heath Blackgrove	Time trial	1:03:20.11	32
Julian Dean	Road race	5:41:56	15
Robin Reid	Road race	Did not finish	
Jeremy Yates	Road race	Did not finish	

Women

Athlete	Event	Time	Rank
Melissa Holt	Road race	Did not finish	
Michelle Hyland	Road race	3:40:43	56
Jo Kiesanowski	Road race	3:25:42	17

=== Track ===
Pursuit

Athlete	Event	Qualification		Semifinals		Final	
Athlete	Event	Time	Rank	Opponent Results	Rank	Opponent Results	Rank
Hayden Godfrey	Men's individual pursuit	DNS		Did not advance			
Sarah Ulmer	Women's individual pursuit	3:26.279 WR	1 Q	Slyusareva (RUS); 3:27.444	1 Q	Mactier (AUS); 3:24.537	1st place, gold medalist(s)
Hayden Godfrey; Tim Gudsell*; Peter Latham; Matthew Randall; Marc Ryan	Men's team pursuit	4:10.820	10	Did not advance			

Omnium

Athlete	Event	Points	Laps	Rank
Greg Henderson	Men's points race	68	3	4
Sarah Ulmer	Women's points race	8	0	6
Greg Henderson; Hayden Roulston	Men's madison	2	0	7

=== Mountain biking ===
Athlete	Event	Time	Rank
Kashi Leuchs	Men's cross-country	2:28:20	20
Robyn Wong	Women's cross-country	2:10:59	16

== Equestrian ==
=== Dressage ===
Athlete	Horse	Event	Grand Prix		Grand Prix Special		Grand Prix Freestyle		Overall	
Athlete	Horse	Event	Score	Rank	Score	Rank	Score	Rank	Score	Rank
Louisa Hill	Gabana	Individual	62.708	49	Did not advance					

=== Eventing ===
Athlete	Horse	Event	Dressage		Cross-country			Jumping						Total	
Athlete	Horse	Event	Dressage		Cross-country			Qualifier			Final			Total	
Athlete	Horse	Event	Penalties	Rank	Penalties	Total	Rank	Penalties	Total	Rank	Penalties	Total	Rank	Penalties	Rank
Matthew Grayling	Revo	Individual	47.20	22	0.00	47.20	17	12.00 #	59.20	19 Q	4.00	63.20	15	63.20	15
Daniel Jocelyn	Silence	Individual	66.80 #	=61	0.00	66.80 #	35	4.00	70.80 #	29	Did not advance			70.80	29
Andrew Nicholson	Finicio	Individual	63.40	=52	72.20 #	135.60 #	64	14.00 #	149.60 #	61	Did not advance			149.60	61
Blyth Tait	Reddy Teddy	Individual	63.80 #	=54	1.20 #	65.00	=33	4.00	69.00	26	Did not advance			69.00	26
Heelan Tompkins	Glengarrick	Individual	44.00	13	0.00	44.00	10	4.00	48.00	7 Q	4.00	52.00	7	52.00	7
Matthew Grayling; Daniel Jocelyn; Andrew Nicholson; Blyth Tait; Heelan Tompkins	See above	Team	154.60	6	0.00	156.20	=1	12.00	176.20	=4	—N/a			176.20	5

"#" indicates that the score of this rider does not count in the team competition, since only the best three results of a team are counted.

=== Show jumping ===
Athlete	Horse	Event	Qualification								Final					Total	
Athlete	Horse	Event	Round 1		Round 2			Round 3			Round A		Round B			Total	
Athlete	Horse	Event	Penalties	Rank	Penalties	Total	Rank	Penalties	Total	Rank	Penalties	Rank	Penalties	Total	Rank	Penalties	Rank
Grant Cashmore	Franklin's Flyte	Individual	0	=1	12	12	=28 Q	20	32	48 Q	20	=40	Did not advance				
Bruce Goodin	Braveheart	Individual	28	74	28	56	67 Q	Retired			Did not advance						
Daniel Meech	Diagonal	Individual	13	=63	6	19	45 Q	1	20	=29 Q	1	3 Q	13	14	13	14	13
Guy Thomas	NZ Madison	Individual	16	=69	13	29	62 Q	29	58	=58	Did not advance						
Grant Cashmore; Bruce Goodin; Daniel Meech; Guy Thomas	See above	Team	—N/a								31	12	Did not advance			31	12

== Fencing ==
Women

Athlete	Event	Round of 64	Round of 32	Round of 16	Quarterfinal	Semifinal	Final / BM	
Athlete	Event	Opposition Score	Opposition Score	Opposition Score	Opposition Score	Opposition Score	Opposition Score	Rank
Jessica Eliza Beer	Individual épée	Magkandaki (GRE); L 8–15	Did not advance					

== Field hockey ==
New Zealand qualified a men's and a women's team. Each team had 16 athletes with two reserves.

=== Men's tournament ===
Roster

The following is the New Zealand roster in the men's field hockey tournament of the 2004 Summer Olympics.

Head coach: Kevin Towns

1. Simon Towns (C)
2. Mitesh Patel
3. Dave Kosoof
4. Darren Smith
5. Wayne McIndoe
6. Dion Gosling
7. Blair Hopping
8. Dean Couzins
11. Umesh Parag
14. Bevan Hari
16. Paul Woolford (GK)
17. Kyle Pontifex (GK)
18. Phil Burrows
19. Hayden Shaw
20. James Nation
24. Gareth Brooks

Group play

Pos	Team	Pld	W	D	L	GF	GA	GD	Pts	Qualification
1	Netherlands	5	5	0	0	16	9	+7	15	Semi-finals
2	Australia	5	3	1	1	14	10	+4	10	Semi-finals
3	New Zealand	5	3	0	2	13	11	+2	9	5–8th place semi-finals
4	India	5	1	1	3	11	13	−2	4	5–8th place semi-finals
5	South Africa	5	1	0	4	9	15	−6	3	9–12th place semi-finals
6	Argentina	5	0	2	3	8	13	−5	2	9–12th place semi-finals

Source: FIH

15 August 2004
08:30

Australia	4–1	New Zealand
Elder 15'; Dwyer 24', 42', 60'	Report	Smith 58'

Umpires:
David Leiper (GBR)
Amarjit Singh (MAS)

17 August 2004
20:00

New Zealand	3–4	Netherlands
Shaw 9', 55'; Burrows 59'	Report	Taekema 4', 24'; Klaver 39'; Van der Weide 68'

Umpires:
David Gentles (AUS)
Sumesh Putra (CAN)

19 August 2004
20:00

New Zealand	3–1	Argentina
Shaw 12'; Hari 44'; Burrows 49'	Report	Lombi 8'

Umpires:
David Leiper (GBR)
Pedro Teixeira (POR)

21 August 2004
10:30

India	1–2	New Zealand
D. Pillay 62'	Report	Burrows 36'; Shaw 70+'

Umpires:
Ray O'Connor (IRL)
Xavier Adell (ESP)

23 August 2004
08:30

New Zealand	4–1	South Africa
Kosoof 15'; Shaw 38', 46'; Burrows 70'	Report	Smith 28'

Umpires:
Christian Blasch (GER)
Sumesh Putra (CAN)

5th–8th place semifinal

25 August 2004
18:00

New Zealand	4–3	South Korea
Burrows 26', 62', 69'; McIndoe 28'	Report	Yeo Woon-Kon 14'; Lee Jung-Seon 39'; Jeon Jong-Ha 57'

Umpires:
Peter Elders (NED)
Xavier Adell (ESP)

5th place final

27 August 2004
11:00

New Zealand	2–4	Pakistan
Brooks 16'; Smith 35'	Report	Abbas 35', 47', 68'; Jawad 55'

Umpires:
Sumesh Putra (CAN)
David Leiper (GBR)

=== Women's tournament ===
Roster

The following is the New Zealand roster in the women's field hockey tournament of the 2004 Summer Olympics.

Head coach: Ian Rutledge

1. Kayla Sharland
2. Emily Naylor
5. Rachel Sutherland
6. Meredith Orr
8. Jaimee Provan
9. Leisen Jobe
10. Lizzy Igasan
11. Stacey Carr
12. Lisa Walton
14. Suzie Muirhead (C)
15. Beth Jurgeleit (GK)
16. Helen Clarke (GK)
18. Diana Weavers
21. Niniwa Roberts
22. Rachel Robertson
23. Tara Drysdale

Group play

Pos	Team	Pld	W	D	L	GF	GA	GD	Pts	Qualification
1	China	4	4	0	0	11	2	+9	12	Semi-finals
2	Argentina	4	3	0	1	12	4	+8	9	Semi-finals
3	Japan	4	2	0	2	5	7	−2	6	
4	New Zealand	4	1	0	3	3	9	−6	3	
5	Spain	4	0	0	4	3	12	−9	0	

Source: FIH
Rules for classification: 1) Points; 2) Matches won; 3) Goal difference; 4) Goals for; 5) Head-to-head result.

16 August 2004
18:00

New Zealand	0–2	China
	Report	Ma Yibo 16'; Tang Chunling 41'

Umpires:
Jean Duncan (GBR)
Soledad Iparraguirre (ARG)

18 August 2004
20:00

Japan	2–0	New Zealand
Komori 18', 52'	Report

Umpires:
Carolina de la Fuente (ARG)
Gina Spitaleri (ITA)

20 August 2004
10:30

New Zealand	0–3	Argentina
	Report	Aymar 8'; Oneto 38'; García 53'

Umpires:
Chieko Akiyama (JPN)
Julie Ashton-Lucy (AUS)

22 August 2004
10:30

Spain	2–3	New Zealand
Goikoetxea 21', 40'	Report	Provan 21'; Roberts-Lang 30'; Igasan 50'

Umpires:
Chieko Akiyama (JPN)
Julie Ashton-Lucy (AUS)

5th–8th place semifinal

24 August 2004
08:30

South Korea	2–3 (a.e.t.)	New Zealand
Kim Yun-Mi 44'; Park Mi-Hyun 46'	Report	Roberts-Lang 4'; Muirhead 8'; Walton 80'

Umpires:
Ute Conen (GER)
Jean Duncan (GBR)

5th place final

27 August 2004
11:00

New Zealand	0–3	Australia
	Report	Towers 14'; Powell 42', 67'

Umpires:
Chieko Akiyama (JPN)
Gina Spitaleri (ITA)

== Judo ==
Athlete	Event	Round of 32	Round of 16	Quarterfinals	Semifinals	Repechage 1	Repechage 2	Repechage 3	Final / BM	
Athlete	Event	Opposition Result	Opposition Result	Opposition Result	Opposition Result	Opposition Result	Opposition Result	Opposition Result	Opposition Result	Rank
Rochelle Stormont	Women's −52 kg	Aluaş (ROM); L 0000–1010	Did not advance							

== Rowing ==
New Zealand rowers qualified the following boats:

Men

Athlete	Event	Heats		Repechage		Semifinals		Final	
Athlete	Event	Time	Rank	Time	Rank	Time	Rank	Time	Rank
George Bridgewater; Nathan Twaddle	Pair	6:54.75	1 SA/B	Bye		6:24.49	3 FA	6:34.24	4
Mahé Drysdale; Donald Leach; Carl Meyer; Eric Murray	Four	6:22.91	2 SA/B	Bye		5:52.95	2 FA	6:15.47	4

Women

Athlete	Event	Heats		Repechage		Semifinals		Final	
Athlete	Event	Time	Rank	Time	Rank	Time	Rank	Time	Rank
Sonia Waddell	Single sculls	7:36.15	1 SA/B/C	Bye		7:42.00	3 FA	7:31.66	6
Nicky Coles; Juliette Haigh	Pair	9:37.53	5 R	7:11.00	2 FA	—N/a		7:23.52	6
Caroline Evers-Swindell; Georgina Evers-Swindell	Double sculls	7:25.57	1 FA	Bye		—N/a		7:01.79	1st place, gold medalist(s)

Qualification Legend: FA=Final A (medal); FB=Final B (non-medal); FC=Final C (non-medal); FD=Final D (non-medal); FE=Final E (non-medal); FF=Final F (non-medal); SA/B=Semifinals A/B; SC/D=Semifinals C/D; SE/F=Semifinals E/F; R=Repechage

== Sailing ==
New Zealand sailors have qualified one boat for each of the following events.

Men

Athlete	Event	Race											Net points	Final rank
Athlete	Event	1	2	3	4	5	6	7	8	9	10	M*	Net points	Final rank
Tom Ashley	Mistral	17	7	3	~~18~~	14	8	14	18	3	3	11	98	10
Dean Barker	Finn	5	10	7	11	7	16	~~DNF~~	12	19	20	10	118	9
Andrew Brown; Jamie Hunt	470	~~27~~	24	23	23	22	13	14	10	26	25	20	200	26

Women

Athlete	Event	Race											Net points	Final rank
Athlete	Event	1	2	3	4	5	6	7	8	9	10	M*	Net points	Final rank
Barbara Kendall	Mistral	1	9	~~OCS~~	2	OCS	5	5	3	1	1	4	58	5
Sarah Macky	Europe	14	4	8	19	4	~~20~~	6	4	10	10	17	91	8
Linda Dickson; Shelley Hesson	470	6	8	10	5	17	~~18~~	15	13	4	17	13	118	16
Sharon Ferris; Kylie Jameson; Joanna White	Yngling	15	~~16~~	3	2	2	9	11	7	12	10	9	77	7

Open

Athlete	Event	Race											Net points	Final rank
Athlete	Event	1	2	3	4	5	6	7	8	9	10	M*	Net points	Final rank
Hamish Pepper	Laser	24	9	~~26~~	11	9	8	13	3	RDG	2	21	108.3	7

M = Medal race; OCS = On course side of the starting line; DSQ = Disqualified; DNF = Did not finish; DNS= Did not start; RDG = Redress given

== Shooting ==
Two New Zealand shooters (one man and one woman) qualified to compete in the following events:

Men

Athlete	Event	Qualification		Final	
Athlete	Event	Points	Rank	Points	Rank
Ryan Taylor	50 m rifle prone	589	=36	Did not advance	

Women

Athlete	Event	Qualification		Final	
Athlete	Event	Points	Rank	Points	Rank
Nadine Stanton	Double trap	108	4 Q	137	6

== Swimming ==
New Zealand swimmers earned qualifying standards in the following events (up to a maximum of 2 swimmers in each event at the A-standard time, and 1 at the B-standard time):

Men

Athlete	Event	Heat		Semifinal		Final	
Athlete	Event	Time	Rank	Time	Rank	Time	Rank
Moss Burmester	400 m freestyle	3:57.29	28	—N/a		Did not advance	
Moss Burmester	1500 m freestyle	15:56.42	28	—N/a		Did not advance	
Moss Burmester	200 m butterfly	1:58.13	10 Q	1:58.09	12	Did not advance	
Cameron Gibson	100 m freestyle	51.56	43	Did not advance			
Cameron Gibson	100 m backstroke	56.40	34	Did not advance			
Cameron Gibson	200 m backstroke	2:02.65	20	Did not advance			
Dean Kent	200 m individual medley	2:01.31 NR	7 Q	2:01.94	14	Did not advance	
Dean Kent	400 m individual medley	4:18.55	13	—N/a		Did not advance	
Ben Labowitch	100 m breaststroke	1:03.99	36	Did not advance			
Ben Labowitch	200 m breaststroke	2:19.25	39	Did not advance			
Corney Swanepoel	100 m butterfly	53.07	15 Q	52.99	13	Did not advance	
Cameron Gibson; Ben Labowitch; Corney Swanepoel; Scott Talbot-Cameron	4 × 100 m medley relay	3:42.74	12	—N/a		Did not advance	

Women

Athlete	Event	Heat		Semifinal		Final	
Athlete	Event	Time	Rank	Time	Rank	Time	Rank
Annabelle Carey	100 m breaststroke	1:13.13	35	Did not advance			
Elizabeth Coster	100 m butterfly	1:00.61	23	Did not advance			
Alison Fitch	50 m freestyle	26.56	34	Did not advance			
Alison Fitch	100 m freestyle	56.29	21	Did not advance			
Alison Fitch	200 m freestyle	2:03.58	29	Did not advance			
Rebecca Linton	400 m freestyle	4:21.58	31	—N/a		Did not advance	
Rebecca Linton	800 m freestyle	9:02.41	24	—N/a		Did not advance	
Hannah McLean	100 m backstroke	1:03.09	22	Did not advance			
Hannah McLean	200 m backstroke	2:13.33	9 Q	2:12.87	10	Did not advance	
Helen Norfolk	200 m individual medley	2:17.27	16 Q	2:17.41	16	Did not advance	
Helen Norfolk	400 m individual medley	4:45.21	9	—N/a		Did not advance	
Nathalie Bernard; Alison Fitch; Rebecca Linton; Helen Norfolk	4 × 200 m freestyle relay	8:14.76	13	—N/a		Did not advance	
Annabelle Carey; Elizabeth Coster; Alison Fitch; Hannah McLean	4 × 100 m medley relay	4:10.37	13	—N/a		Did not advance	

== Table tennis ==
Two New Zealand table tennis players qualified for the following events.

Athlete	Event	Round 1	Round 2	Round 3	Round 4	Quarterfinals	Semifinals	Final / BM	
Athlete	Event	Opposition Result	Opposition Result	Opposition Result	Opposition Result	Opposition Result	Opposition Result	Opposition Result	Rank
Chunli Li	Women's singles	Bye	Banh (USA); W 4–1	Zhang Yn (CHN); L 0–4	Did not advance				
Chunli Li; Karen Li	Women's doubles	Bye	Lay / Miao (AUS); W 4–2	Schall / Struse (AUS); W 4–1	Kim H-M / Kim H-H (PRK); L 2–4	Did not advance			

== Taekwondo ==
New Zealand has qualified a single taekwondo jin.

Athlete	Event	Round of 16	Quarterfinals	Semifinals	Repechage 1	Repechage 2	Final / BM	
Athlete	Event	Opposition Result	Opposition Result	Opposition Result	Opposition Result	Opposition Result	Opposition Result	Rank
Verina Wihongi	Women's −67 kg	Mystakidou (GRE); L 0–4	Did not advance		Juárez (GUA); L 1–4	Did not advance		7

== Triathlon ==
Three New Zealand triathletes qualified for the following events.

Athlete	Event	Swim (1.5 km)	Trans 1	Bike (40 km)	Trans 2	Run (10 km)	Total Time	Rank
Hamish Carter	Men's	18:19	0:20	1:00:44	0:18	32:04	1:51:07.73	1st place, gold medalist(s)
Bevan Docherty	Men's	18:13	0:19	1:00:51	0:20	32:11	1:51:15.60	2nd place, silver medalist(s)
Nathan Richmond	Men's	18:04	0:20	1:02:51	0:19	37:06	1:58:01.94	33
Samantha Warriner	Women's	19:42	0:20	1:10:45	0:20	38:15	2:08:42.07	18

== See also ==
- New Zealand at the 2002 Commonwealth Games
- New Zealand at the 2004 Summer Paralympics
