= Tyschler =

Tyschler or Tyshler is a surname, a transliteration from Ukrainian: Тишлер or Russian: Тышлер. Notable people with the surname include:

- Alexander Tyshler
- David Tyshler

== See also ==
- Tychler
