= Hajnalka Kiraly =

French fencer

Personal information
- Nickname: Hajni
- Born: 2 March 1971 (age 55) Veszprém, Hungary
- Height: 1.69 m (5 ft 7 in)
- Weight: 55 kg (121 lb)

Fencing career
- Sport: Fencing
- Weapon: Épée
- Hand: right-handed
- Club: Honvéd-LNX; Club sportif de la garnison de Rennes (2002–2008); Lagardère Paris Racing (from 2008)
- Retired: 2012
- FIE ranking: ranking (archive)
Medal record
Women's Épée
Representing Hungary
World Championships
Gold medal – first place	1993 Essen	Team épée
Gold medal – first place	1997 Cape Town	Team épée
Gold medal – first place	2002 Lisbon	Team épée
Silver medal – second place	1994 Athens	Team épée
European Championships
Gold medal – first place	2001 Coblenz	Team épée
Bronze medal – third place	2001 Coblenz	Épée
Silver medal – second place	2002 Madeira	Team épée
Representing France
Olympic Games
Bronze medal – third place	2004 Athens	Team Épée
World Championships
Gold medal – first place	2005 Leipzig	Team épée
Gold medal – first place	2007 St Petersburg	Team épée
Gold medal – first place	2008 Beijing	Team épée
Silver medal – second place	2006 Torino	Team épée
European Championships
Bronze medal – third place	2007 Ghent	Team épée
Bronze medal – third place	2010 Leipzig	Team épée
Mediterranean Games
Gold medal – first place	2005 Almería	Individual épée

Hajnalka Kiraly-Picot (French: [ˈhɒjnɒlkɒ ˈkiraːj piko]; born March 2, 1971, in Veszprém) is a Hungarian-born French épée fencer. With Hungary she was three-time team World champion (1993, 1997, and 2002) and 2001 team European champion. With France, she won the team bronze medal at the 2004 Summer Olympics as well as three team world titles (2005, 2007, and 2008).

== Career ==
Kiraly began fencing at the age of 10 on a friend's suggestion. When she was 18 she joined Honvéd Budapest, the sports club of the Hungarian Defence Force. She won in 1991 the silver medal at the Junior World Championships in Istanbul. Two years she became a component of the national épée team along with Tímea Nagy, Ildikó Mincza-Nébald and Adrienn Hormay. She was selected for the 1996 Summer Olympics in Atlanta, but only as a reserve. As such she did not live in the Olympic village and could not access the official ceremonies. Frustrated, she promised herself she would never be a reserve again.

At the end of the 1999 season she stood third in FIE world rankings, but was not selected for the 2000 Summer Olympics in Atlanta. She did not make the team for the 2001 World Fencing Championships either. During a competition she met Patrick Picot, 1980 Olympic team champion and France national coach for men's épée. She moved with him in Rennes, Brittany and married him in July 2002. She took part in the World Championships that year, but was kept as reserve during the final. Tired by the commuting between France and Hungary and frustrated by the lack of selections, she decided to fence for France from January 2003. Her first competition under French colours was in Budapest, in front of her parents.

The 2004 Summer Olympics in Athens were Kiraly's first Games as a titular member of the team alongside Laura Flessel-Colovic, Maureen Nisima and Sarah Daninthe. In the individual event, she was defeated in the second round by teammate Laura Flessel and finished 15th. In the team event France defeated China, but lost 44–45 against Germany in the semi-finals. They prevailed over Canada in the small final and came away with a bronze medal. Kiraly went on to win the World title with France in 2005, after defeating Hungary in the final, and in 2007.

The Olympic programme did not include women's team épée, which was disputed a few months before as a World Championship, also in Beijing. France defeated China in the final to come away with a gold medal, the sixth in Kiraly's collection. Kiraly qualified for the 2008 Summer Olympics in Beijing due to her Top 8 ranking, but was defeated in the second round again: after leading 12–8 in the last period, she could not stop the comeback of Sweden's Emma Samuelsson. Frustrated, she decided to go on with her career despite signs of aging. She would not however win other world titles: in the 2009 World Championships, France were defeated by Italy in the semi-finals, then by Germany, and finished fourth. In the 2010 World Championships at home in Paris, France had a hard time prevailing upon Switzerland and were stopped in the quarter-finals by Romania. Kiraly left the national team after the 2009–2010 season and took part in World Cup competitions only. Her last tournament was the 2012 Challenge International de Saint-Maur.
