= Fencing at the 2000 Commonwealth Youth Games =

Fencing at the I Commonwealth Youth Games
- Dates: 11 – 13 August
- Host city: Edinburgh, Scotland
- Venue: Heriot Watt University
- Events: 4
- Participation: 42 (21 boys, 21 girls) athletes from 7 nations

At the 2000 Commonwealth Youth Games, the fencing events were held at the Heriot Watt University in Edinburgh, Scotland from 11 to 13 August. Team and Individual Foil Events took place in both categories. Bronze medal matches were held in the team events, but not the individual, where both beaten semi-finalists are listed.

== Medal summary ==
=== Medal table ===
* Host nation ( SCO)

Rank	Nation	Gold	Silver	Bronze	Total
1	ENG	2	2	2	6
2	CAN	1	2	1	4
3	SCO*	1	0	3	4
Totals (3 entries)		4	4	6	14

== Boys ==
Event	Gold	Silver	Bronze	
Individual Foil	Josh McGuire (CAN)	Andrew Beevers (ENG)	Laurence Halstead (ENG)	Alexander Vicefield (ENG)
Team Foil	ENGLAND (ENG); Andrew Beevers; Laurence Halstead; Alexander Vicefield	CANADA (CAN); Josh McGuire; Jean-Francois Sigouin; Louis-Paul Hetu	SCOTLAND (SCO); Gordon Jamieson; Brendan Forrester; Struan Zawainyski	

=== Finals ===
Semi-finals
Josh McGuire (CAN)	15
Laurence Halsted (ENG)	7
Andrew Beevers (ENG)	15
Alexander Vicefield (ENG)	10

Final
Josh McGuire (CAN)	15
Andrew Beevers (ENG)	11

=== Top half ===
Round of 32
Kenneth Grahame (NIR)	15
B.Hess (RSA)	10
J.Wilson (NIR)	15
Struan Zawainyski (SCO)	9
R.Davies (WAL)	15
Johan Petrus Nieuwenhuis (RSA)	9

Round of 16
Josh McGuire (CAN)	15
Kenneth Grahame (NIR)	4
Jean-Francois Sigouin (CAN)	15
P.Anderson (AUS)	11
Gordon Jamieson (SCO)	15
J.Wilson (NIR)	6
R.Davies (WAL)	6
Laurence Halsted (ENG)	15

Quarter-finals
Josh McGuire (CAN)	15
Jean-Francois Sigouin (CAN)	10
Gordon Jamieson (SCO)	10
Laurence Halsted (ENG)	15

Semi-finals
Josh Mcguire (CAN)	15
Laurence Halsted (ENG)	7

=== Bottom half ===
Round of 32
Louis-Paul Hetu (CAN)	15
Mark Adair (NIR)	12
A.Jarman (WAL)	15
Roger Fok (RSA)	7

Round of 16
Andrew Beevers (ENG)	15
Louis-Paul Hetu (CAN)	3
Hugh Cotman (AUS)	10
Simon Witkop (AUS)	15
Brendan Forrester (SCO)	15
Alec Brooke (AUS)	5
A.Jarman (WAL)	14
Alexander Vicefield (ENG)	15

Quarter-finals
Andrew Beevers (ENG)	15
Simon Witkop (AUS)	3
Brendan Forrester (SCO)	9
Alexander Vicefield (ENG)	15

Semi-finals
Andrew Beevers (ENG)	15
Alexander Vicefield (ENG)	10

=== TEAM FOIL GROUP A ===
Pos	Team	Pld	W	L	LF	LA	LD	Pts	Status
1	England	2	2	0	90	40	+50	4	Q
2	Scotland	2	1	1	63	88	−25	2	Q
3	Wales	2	0	2	64	90	−26	0	E

RESULTS:

- England 45-19 Scotland
- Scotland 45-43 Wales
- England 45-21 Wales

=== TEAM FOIL GROUP B ===
Pos	Team	Pld	W	L	LF	LA	LD	Pts	Status
1	Canada	3	3	0	135	96	+39	6	Q
2	Australia	3	2	1	129	90	+39	4	Q
3	South Africa	3	1	2	87	122	−35	2	E
4	Northern Ireland	3	0	3	92	135	−43	0	E

RESULTS:

- Australia 45-36 (Northern Ireland) NIR
- Canada 45-24 (Northern Ireland) NIR
- Australia 45-21 South Africa
- South Africa 45-32 (Northern Ireland) NIR
- Canada 45-39 Australia
- Canada 45-21 South Africa

=== Medal round ===
Semi-finals
Semi Final 1
Canada	45
Scotland	44
Semi Final 2
England	45
Australia	41

Gold-medal match
Gold Medal Match
England	45
Canada	28
Bronze-medal match
Bronze Medal Match
Scotland	45
Australia	29

== Girls ==
Event	Gold	Silver	Bronze	
Individual Foil	Elizabeth Wright (SCO)	Clare Velden (ENG)	Elise Daoust (CAN)	Nicola Ramsay (SCO)
Team Foil	ENGLAND (ENG); Clare Velden; Eve Shepherd; K.Gardner	CANADA (CAN); Elise Daoust; Leigh Voigt; Julia Capatina	SCOTLAND (SCO); Elizabeth Wright; Nicola Ramsay; Tracy McKenzie	

=== Finals ===
Semi-finals
Elizabeth Wright (SCO)	15
Nicola Ramsay (SCO)	6
Clare Velden (ENG)	15
Elise Daoust (CAN)	13

Final
Elizabeth Wright (SCO)	15
Clare Velden (ENG)	12

=== Top half ===
Round of 32
L.Mahoney (WAL)	15
Jacqueline Amm (RSA)	12
Lydia Johnson (WAL)	WO
K.Evans (WAL)

Round of 16
Elizabeth Wright (SCO)	15
L.Mahoney (WAL)	6
Leigh Voigt (CAN)	15
Tracy McKenzie (SCO)	1
Eve Shepherd (ENG)	15
N.Howard (AUS)	12
Lydia Johnson (WAL)	7
Nicola Ramsay (SCO)	15

Quarter-finals
Elizabeth Wright (SCO)	15
Leigh Voigt (CAN)	6
Eve Shepherd (ENG)	6
Nicola Ramsay (SCO)	15

Semi-finals
Elizabeth Wright (SCO)	15
Nicola Ramsay (SCO)	6

=== Bottom half ===
Round of 32
C.Mason (NIR)	15
Rachel Barlow (RSA)	9
Jessica Sullivan (AUS)	15
Judith Johnston (NIR)	12

Round of 16
Clare Velden (ENG)	15
C.Mason (NIR)	4
Lindsay Mcgrath (AUS)	11
Julia Capatina (CAN)	15
K.Gardner (ENG)	15
Jessica Sullivan (AUS)	8
Joanne Savage (NIR)	8
Elise Daoust (CAN)	15

Quarter-finals
Clare Velden (ENG)	15
Julia Capatina (CAN)	8
K.Gardner (ENG)	13
Elise Daoust (CAN)	15

Semi-finals
Clare Velden (ENG)	15
Elise Daoust (CAN)	13

=== TEAM FOIL ===
Semi-finals
Semi Final 1
England	45
Scotland	42
Semi Final 2
Canada	45
Australia	20

Gold-medal match
Gold Medal Match
England	45
Canada	35
Bronze-medal match
Bronze Medal Match
Scotland	45
Australia	29
