= Marysa Baradji-Duchêne =

French fencer (born 1982)

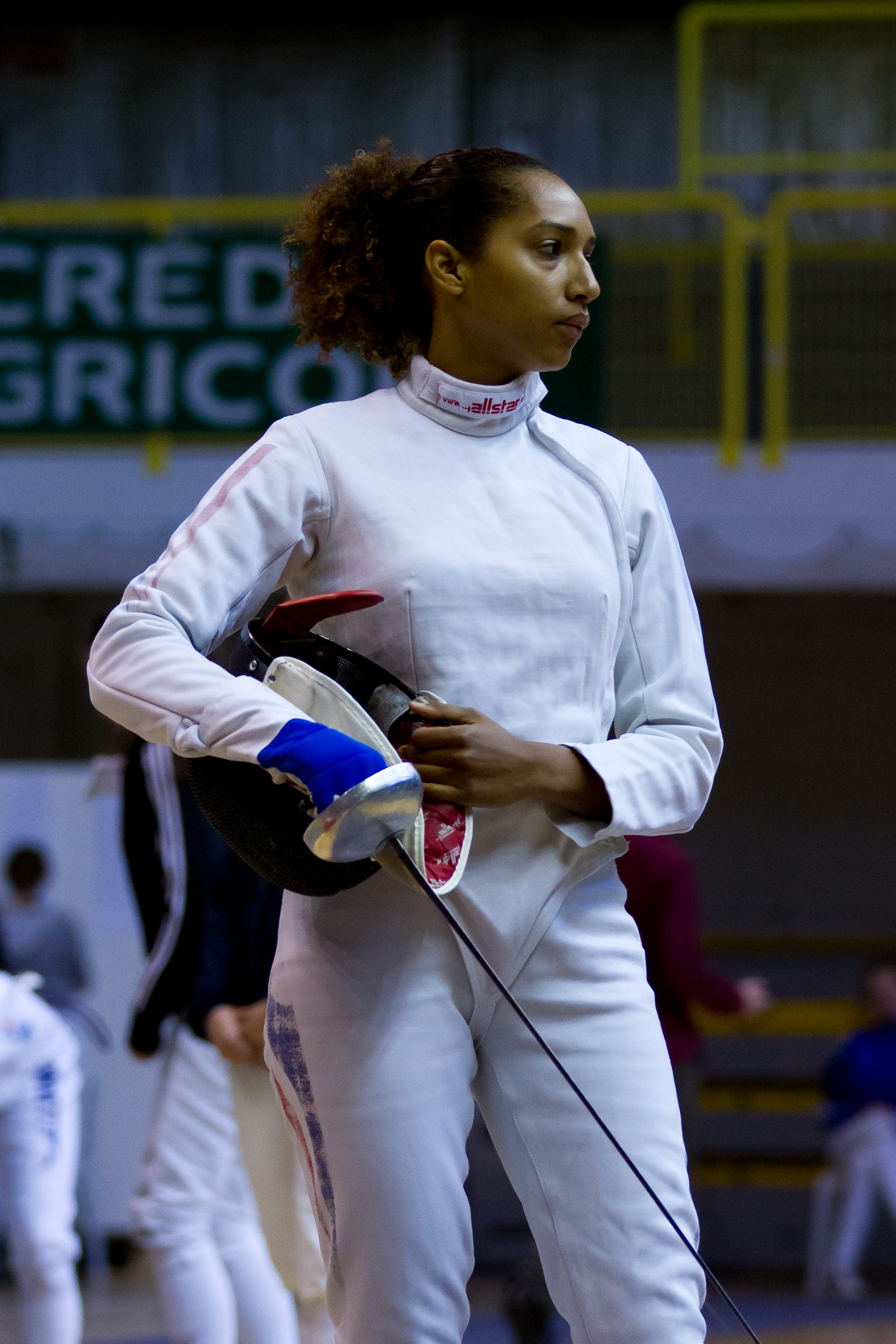
Marysa Baradji-Duchêne in Toulouse in May 2013

Marysa Baradji-Duchêne (born 17 October 1982) is a French épée fencer.

Baradji-Duchêne won the silver medal in the épée team event at the 2006 World Fencing Championships after losing to China in the final. She accomplished this with her teammates Hajnalka Kiraly, Maureen Nisima, and Laura Flessel-Colovic.

== Achievements ==
2006 European Seniors Fencing Championship, épée
