= 2002 European Fencing Championships =

The 2002 European Fencing Championships were held in Moscow. The event took place from 3 to 8 June 2002.

== Medal summary ==
=== Men's events ===
Event	Gold	Silver	Bronze
Foil	Andrea Cassarà (ITA)	Simon Senft (GER)	Michael Ludwig (AUT); Sławomir Mocek (POL)
Épée	Gábor Boczkó (HUN)	Pavel Kolobkov (RUS)	Géza Imre (HUN); Iván Kovács (HUN)
Sabre	Stanislav Pozdnyakov (RUS)	Sergey Sharikov (RUS)	Mihai Covaliu (ROU); Volodymyr Lukashenko (UKR)
Team Foil	Italy	France	Germany
Team Épée	France	Poland	Ukraine
Team Sabre	Russia	Italy	Hungary

=== Women's events ===
Event	Gold	Silver	Bronze
Foil	Sylwia Gruchała (POL)	Laura Badea-Cârlescu (ROU)	Svetlana Boyko (RUS); Roxana Scarlat (ROU)
Épée	Maureen Nisima (FRA)	Niki-Katerina Sidiropoulou (GRE)	Lyubov Shutova (RUS); Oksana Yermakova (RUS)
Sabre	Cécile Argiolas (FRA)	Yelena Nechayeva (RUS)	Orsolya Nagy (HUN); Irina Bajenova (RUS)
Team Foil	Poland	Hungary	Russia
Team Épée	Hungary	Russia	Ukraine
Team Sabre	Russia	Hungary	Azerbaijan

=== Medal table ===
Rank	Nation	Gold	Silver	Bronze	Total
1	Russia	3	4	5	12
2	France	3	1	0	4
3	Hungary	2	2	4	8
4	Poland	2	1	1	4
5	Italy	2	1	0	3
6	Romania	0	1	2	3
7	Germany	0	1	1	2
8	Greece	0	1	0	1
9	Ukraine	0	0	3	3
10	Austria	0	0	1	1
10	Azerbaijan	0	0	1	1
Totals (11 entries)		12	12	18	42
