= Miss Teen Canada =

Canadian beauty competition (1969–1990)

Miss Teen Canada was a personality and beauty competition in Canada for girls aged 14 to 17. The event started in 1969 and was televised on CTV. The pageant was named Miss Teenage Canada for its first three years and was originally sponsored by A&W Drive-Ins. Cleo Productions, who owned the event for most of its years, closed the contest down in 1990 due to financial concerns.

Several teen pageants exist again in Canada today, the biggest of which is Miss Teenage Canada, run by Michelle Weswaldi, Miss World Canada 1996. The winner of Miss Teenage Canada goes on to compete at Miss Teen Universe.

== Winners ==
The following is a complete list of winners of the Miss Teen Canada competition (1969–1992):

Year	Name	Region
2013	Celina Rivas Vasquez	London, Ontario
2012	Alexia Océanne-Soudin	Saint-Bruno, Québec
2011	Magalie Touchette	Laval, Québec
2010	Danika Lalonde-Ouellet	Salaberry-de-Valleyfield, Québec
2009	Kim Larivée	Montréal, Québec
1990	Tonya Goss	Niagara Region, Ontario
1989	Monique Kavelaars	London, Ontario
1988	Dara Sutton	Calgary, Alberta
1987	Heather Morton	Toronto, Ontario
1986	Lisa Sawka	Winnipeg, Manitoba
1985	Terri Lynn Smith	Halifax/Dartmouth, Nova Scotia
1984	Karen Alynne MacBean	Swift Current, Saskatchewan
1983	Lori Assheton-Smith	Edmonton, Alberta
1982	Emily Sertic	Edmonton, Alberta
1981	Heather Hiscox	Owen Sound, Ontario
1980	Clara Jean Howard	Prince Edward Island
1979	Jody-Lynn Trammell	Vancouver, British Columbia
1978	Julie Simoneau	Quebec City, Quebec
1977	Nancy-Jane Newburn	Sudbury, Ontario
1976	Shelley Lynn Homick	Windsor, Ontario
1975	Katherine Eckel	Regina, Saskatchewan
1974	Diana Lynn MacDonald	National Capital Region, Ontario/Quebec
1973	Heather Forton	Montreal, Quebec
1972	Lori Elaine Rowe	Vancouver, British Columbia
1971	Jean Anne Blair	New Brunswick
1970	Jana Jorgenson	British Columbia
1969	Jewel McAvany	Montreal, Quebec

== Hosts ==
- Pierre Lalonde
- Peter Pringle
- Alex Trebek
