= Cheung Yi Nei =

Hong Kong fencer

Medal record

Women's Fencing

Asian Games
Bronze medal – third place	2006 Doha	Epée Team

Cheung Yi Nei (born 20 November 1973) is a fencer from Hong Kong, who won a bronze medal at the 2006 Asian Games in the women's épée team competition.
