= Ingrid Kavelaars =

Canadian actress (born 1971)

- Born: March 20, 1971 (age 54); London, Ontario, Canada
- Occupation: Actress
- Spouse: Dallas Eakins
- Relatives: Monique Kavelaars; JJ Kavelaars

Ingrid Kavelaars (born March 20, 1971) is a Canadian actress known for her role on the science-fiction series Code Name: Eternity.

== Early life ==
Kavelaars was born in London, Ontario, Canada. Her parents are Dutch. Her mother, Anne, was a homemaker and her father, John, was a farmer. Kavelaars and her twin Monique are the youngest of five children. Kavelaars at 15 was named Miss Teen London (Ontario) in 1987, and that year was first runner-up for Miss Teen Canada.

She moved to New York City at 18 to study at The American Musical and Dramatic Academy. Following theater work in New York, she relocated first to Toronto, where she appeared in commercials, and then Vancouver, British Columbia, where she began work in series television.

== Career ==
Kavelaars appeared in three episodes of the Canadian/American science-fiction series Stargate SG-1 in 2003 and 2004, playing U.S. Air Force Major Erin Gant. That series and the single-season science-fiction Code Name: Eternity, which she starred as psychotherapist Dr. Laura Keating, ran in the U.S. on Syfy. In 2006, she was a main character in the two-season Canadian television series Whistler. In 2010, Kavelaars began playing Lori Unger in the HBO Canada series Living in Your Car.

She also played presidential candidate Harriet Traymore in season two of XIII: The Series.

== Personal life ==
Kavelaars married professional hockey player and coach Dallas Eakins.

== Selected filmography ==
Year	Title	Role	Other notes
1993	Ghost Mom (TV)	Nurse #2	
1995	Senior Trip	Candy	
1996	Specimen	Jessica Randall	
1997	A Call to Remember (TV)	Amy Miller	
1998	Alien Abduction: Incident in Lake County (TV)	Linda McPherson	
1999	Code Name: Eternity	Dr. Laura Keating	
1999	Final Run	April McDonald	TV movie
2001	Romantic Comedy 101	Beth	
2002	The Bed	Michelle	Short film
2002	Jeremiah	Erin	TV Series
2003	Dreamcatcher	Trish	
2003	Jinnah - On Crime: White Knight, Black Widow	Rachel Bach	
2004	Intern Academy	Mira Towers	
2006	Harm's Way	Darlene	
2006	Whistler (TV series)	Jen McKaye	TV Series
2007	ReGenesis (TV series)	Dr. Joanna Sabean	TV Series
2010-2012	Living in Your Car	Lori Unger	TV Series
2012	XIII: The Series	Harriet Traymore	TV series
2013	Bent	Jane	Short film
2014	Lines	Nurse	Short film

== Awards and nominations ==
Kavelaars was nominated for a Leo Award in 2003, in the category of Best Performance by a Female: Short Drama, for her role in The Bed.

In 2007 Kavelaars won a Gemini Award for Best Performance by an Actress in a Guest Role Dramatic Series for her role of Dr. Joanna Sabean in TV series ReGenesis, episode "Phantoms". At the 26th Gemini Awards Kavelaars was nominated in the category Best Performance by an Actress in a Featured Supporting Role or Guest Role in a Comedic Series for her role in Living in Your Car, episode "Chapter 13".
