= Maureen Nisima =

French fencer (born 1981)

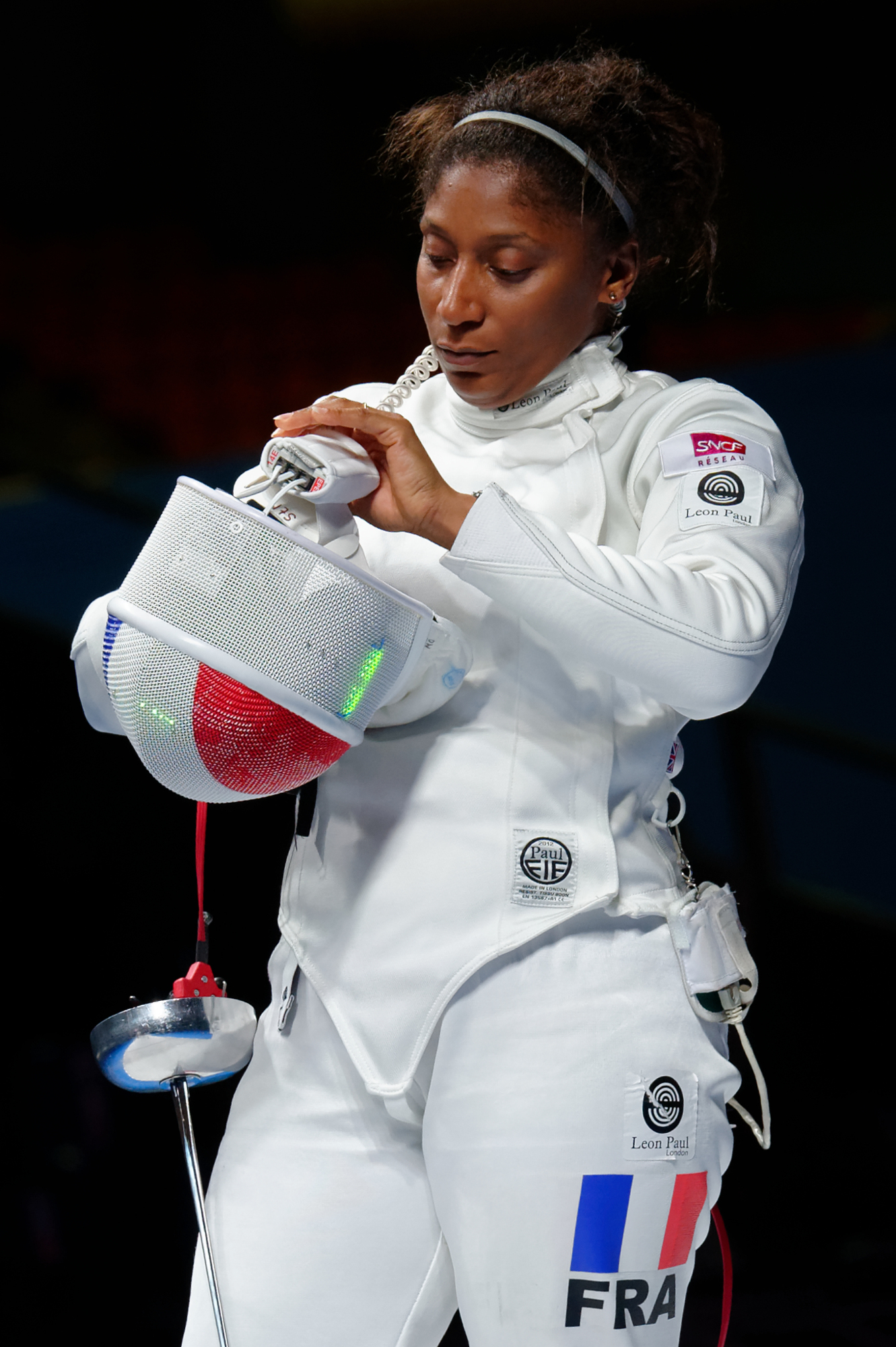

Personal information
- Born: 30 July 1981 (age 44) Bondy, Seine-Saint-Denis, France
- Height: 1.65 m (5 ft 5 in)
- Weight: 63 kg (139 lb)

Fencing career
- Sport: Fencing
- Weapon: épée
- Hand: right-handed
- FIE ranking: current ranking
Medal record
Women's épée
Representing France
Olympic Games
Bronze medal – third place	2004 Athens	Individual
Bronze medal – third place	2004 Athens	Team
World Championships
Gold medal – first place	2005 Leipzig	Team
Gold medal – first place	2007 St Petersburg	Team
Gold medal – first place	2008 Beijing	Team
Gold medal – first place	2010 Paris	Individual
Silver medal – second place	2003 Havana	Individual
Silver medal – second place	2006 Turin	Team
Bronze medal – third place	2007 St Petersburg	Individual

Maureen Nisima (born 30 July 1981 in Bondy, Seine-Saint-Denis) is a French épée fencer, who won the bronze medal at the 2004 Summer Olympics alongside Laura Flessel-Colovic, Hajnalka Kiraly Picot and Sarah Daninthe.

She won the silver medal in the épée team event at the 2006 World Fencing Championships after losing to China in the final. She accomplished this with her teammates Marysa Baradji-Duchene, Hajnalka Kiraly Picot and Laura Flessel-Colovic.

She also won the gold medal at the 2010 World Fencing Championships in Paris, defeating Emese Szász of Hungary in the final.

== Other achievements ==
2006 European Seniors Fencing Championship, épée
