= Code Name: Eternity =

Canadian science fiction television series

- Genre: Science fiction
- Created by: William Fruet; Jeff King
- Starring: Cameron Bancroft; Ingrid Kavelaars; Andrew Gillies; Joseph Baldwin; Gordon Currie; Olivier Gruner
- Composer: Trevor Morris
- Country of origin: Canada
- Original language: English
- No. of seasons: 1
- No. of episodes: 26

Production
- Production locations: Toronto, Ontario, Canada
- Running time: 45 minutes
- Production companies: Dune Productions; Protocol Entertainment; UFA International Film & TV Production GmbH; Warner Bros. International Television Production

Original release
- Network: syndication
- Release: May 14 – November 19, 2000

Code Name: Eternity is a Canadian science fiction series that ran for 26 episodes starting in 1999. It was later shown on the Sci Fi Channel in the United States.

The plot involves an alien scientist, David Banning, who comes to Earth and assumes human form in order to perfect technology which will radically change Earth's environment to be suitable for habitation by his own species, i.e. planetary engineering. Having discovered the true nature of Banning's plans, a team of assassins is sent to take him down. Banning's forces kill most of them, but the most dangerous one, Ethaniel, escapes and teams up with a human scientist, Dr. Laura Keating, in an attempt to prevent the destruction of Earth and humanity.

The series was filmed in Toronto, Ontario, Canada. It was cancelled after one season and ended on a cliffhanger.

Echo Bridge Home Entertainment announced Code Name: Eternity: The Complete Series on DVD.

== Cast ==
- Cameron Bancroft as Ethaniel
- Ingrid Kavelaars as Dr. Laura Keating
- Andrew Gillies as David Banning
- Joseph Baldwin as Byder
- Gordon Currie as Dent
- Olivier Gruner as Tawrens
- Jeff Wincott as Breed

== Episodes ==
1. "Ethaniel's Story"
2. "The Mission"
3. "The Hunter"
4. "The Long Drop"
5. "The Watery Grave"
6. "Never Go Home"
7. "Tawrens"
8. "Making Love"
9. "Death Trap"
10. "The Bounty Hunter"
11. "Thief"
12. "Lose Your Dreams"
13. "24 Hours"
14. "Deep Down"
15. "Fatal Error"
16. "Sold Out For a Song"
17. "All the News"
18. "Laura's Story"
19. "Project Midas"
20. "Dark of Night"
21. "Not a Bite to Eat"
22. "The Box"
23. "Underground"
24. "Chameleon"
25. "All Fall Down"
26. "The Shift"
