= Ko Jung-sun =

South Korean fencer (born 1971)

Personal information
- Born: 6 August 1971 (age 54)

Sport
- Sport: Fencing

Ko Jung-sun (born 6 August 1971) is a South Korean fencer. She competed in the épée events at the 1996 and 2000 Summer Olympics.
