= Daniel Jocelyn =

New Zealand equestrian

Personal information
- Born: 11 September 1970 (age 55)

Sport
- Country: New Zealand
- Sport: Equestrian
- Event: Eventing

Daniel Jocelyn (born 11 September 1970) is a New Zealand equestrian. He competed in eventing at the 2004 Summer Olympics in Athens.
