= David Tyshler =

Russian sabreur

Personal information
- Native name: Давид Абрамович Тышлер
- Full name: David Abramovich Tyshler
- Born: 13 June 1927 Kherson, Ukrainian SSR, Soviet Union
- Died: 7 June 2014 (aged 86) Moscow, Russia
- Education: Central State Order of Lenin Institute of Physical Culture (CGOLIFK; 1949); PhD degree; Doctor of Science in Paedogogical Sciences (1983)
- Occupations: Professor and fencing coach
- Employers: Fencing and Modern Pentathlon Department, Russian State University of Physical Education, Sport, Youth and Tourism
- Height: 6 ft 0 in (183 cm)
- Weight: 174 lb (79 kg)

Sport
- Sport: Fencing
- Event: saber
- Club: CSKA Moskva, Moscow, Russia
- Team: Soviet Union

Achievements and titles
- World finals: 1955 World Fencing Championships (bronze medal in team sabre); 1956 World Fencing Championships; 1957 World Fencing Championships (silver medal in team sabre); 1958 World Fencing Championships (silver medals in individual and team sabre), and; 1959 World Fencing Championships (bronze medal in team sabre)
- National finals: Soviet individual sabre champion (1960); Soviet team sabre champion (1953, 1954, 1956, 1958, and 1959)
- Highest world ranking: 2nd (1958)
Medal record
Men's fencing
Representing the Soviet Union
Men's fencing
Bronze medal – third place	1956 Melbourne	Sabre Team

David (also "Davyd") Abramovich Tyshler (Russian: Давид Абрамович Тышлер; 13 June 1927 – 7 June 2014) was a Russian sabreur, part of the first generation of internationally successful Soviet fencers (Olympic bronze medalist in 1956, and five-time World Championship finalist between 1955 and 1959). He is also known as a successful and innovative fencing coach. His notable pupils included Sergey Sharikov, Mark Midler, Mark Rakita, Viktor Sidjak, Viktor Krovopuskov, and Viktor Bazhenov. He choreographed stage and screen combat, and made cameo appearances in Russian cinema.

== Early and personal life ==
Tyshler was Jewish, and was born in Kherson in what is now Ukraine. During World War II his family fled to Moscow, where Tyshler took up fencing.

His son Gennady became a notable fencing coach. His daughter-in-law, épée fencer Natalia Tychler, competed for South Africa at the 2004 Olympics.

== Competitive record ==
Tyshler was a member of the Soviet national sabre team for 11 years. He was the Soviet individual sabre champion in 1960, and team sabre champion in 1953, 1954, 1956, 1958, and 1959.

=== Olympics ===
Tyshler won a bronze medal at the 1956 Summer Olympics in Melbourne at the age of 29 in the team sabre competition.

Tyshler reached the final round in individual sabre at the 1960 Summer Olympics in Rome at the age of 34, finishing in seventh place. He also competed in the team sabre event.

=== World championship medals ===
Tyshler won medals in the:

- 1955 World Fencing Championships (bronze medal in team sabre)
- 1956 World Fencing Championships
- 1957 World Fencing Championships (silver medal in team sabre)
- 1958 World Fencing Championships (silver medals in individual and team sabre), and
- 1959 World Fencing Championships (bronze medal in team sabre).

== Coaching career ==
From 1961 to 1973 Tyshler was the head coach of the Soviet national sabre team, and among his notable pupils were Sergey Sharikov, Viktor Krovopuskov, Mark Midler, Mark Rakita, Viktor Sidyak, and Viktor Bazhenov. He coached five Olympic champions. He became a Merited Master of Sports of the USSR, and Honoured Trainer of the USSR.

Tyshler opened fencing schools in Russia and South Africa.

René Roch, President of the FIE, honoured Tyshler with a gold medal of the FIE for his untiring dedication to the sport of fencing.

== Academic career ==
In 1949 Tyshler graduated from Central State Order of Lenin Institute of Physical Culture (CGOLIFK). In 1983 he was awarded a PhD degree of Doctor of Science in Paedogogical Sciences. In 1984 Tyshler became a professor in the Fencing and Modern Pentathlon Department at what is currently Russian State University of Physical Education, Sport, Youth and Tourism (RGUFKSiT; CGOLIFK, but after several name changes). He became Head of the Cathedra of Fencing. In 1995 he won the All-Russian "Sports Elite 1995" contest as "Russia's best scholar in the sphere of Olympic training".

Tyshler wrote over 170 academic publications, including over 40 books, many of which have been translated into English, Spanish, German, French, Polish, Romanian, and Chinese. He also wrote a book on fencing on stage and screen, and an autobiography. He staged the fencing scenes in a number of Moscow theaters, as well as in Soviet movies including How Czar Peter the Great Married Off His Moor (1978), 31 June (1978), and The Very Same Munchhausen (1979).

Tyshler was chairman of the Board of Directors of the International Charity Fund for Future of Fencing.

== Hall of Fame ==
Tyshler was inducted into the International Jewish Sports Hall of Fame in 2015.

== See also ==
- List of select Jewish fencers
- List of Jewish Olympic medalists
