= Go Jung-nam =

South Korean fencer

Personal information
- Born: 5 November 1975 (age 50)

Sport
- Sport: Fencing

Go Jung-nam (born 5 November 1975) is a South Korean fencer. She competed in the women's team épée event at the 2004 Summer Olympics.
