= Ed Book =

American-New Zealand basketball player

Personal information
- Born: September 23, 1970 (age 56) Buffalo, New York
- Listed height: 211 cm (6 ft 11 in)
- Listed weight: 112 kg (247 lb)

Career information
- High school: McKinley (Buffalo, New York)
- College: Canisius (1988–1992)
- NBA draft: 1992: undrafted
- Playing career: 1994–2007
- Position: Centre
- Coaching career: 2013–present

Career history

Playing
- 1994: Otago Nuggets
- 1995–1996: Palmerston North Jets
- 1997: Wellington Saints
- 1998–2001: Palmerston North Jets
- 2002–2007: Nelson Giants

Coaching
- 2013–2014: Nelson Giants (assistant)
- 2022–2023: Canterbury Rams (assistant)

Career highlights
- As player: NBL champion (2007); 2× NBL All-Star Five (1996, 2002); NBL Most Outstanding Forward (1996); NBL Most Outstanding Kiwi Forward/Centre (2002); NBL scoring champion (1996); As coach: NBL champion (2023)
Medals
Men's basketball
Representing New Zealand
Commonwealth Games
| Silver medal – second place | 2006 Melbourne | Team |

Edward Frank Book (born September 23, 1970) is an American-New Zealand former professional basketball player. Listed at 211 cm (6 ft 11 in) and 112 kg, Book played the centre position.

== Playing career ==
Book was born in Buffalo, New York, and played college basketball at Canisius College. After four years for the Canisius Golden Griffins, he went undrafted in the 1992 NBA draft.

Book moved to New Zealand in 1994 to play in the NBL. He was consistently one of the best post players in the league, winning Outstanding Forward in 1996, Outstanding Kiwi Forward in 2002 and named to the All-Star Five both years. He played in every NBL season between 1994 and 2007, winning a championship with the Nelson Giants in his final season.

Book debuted for the Tall Blacks against China in 2002, filling the one available naturalized player spot under FIBA rules. He earned hero status during the world championship campaign after stepping into a starting role to fill in for Sean Marks. Book's three-point shooting ability made him a difficult match-up for opposing centres. Book helped New Zealand to a silver medal at the 2006 Commonwealth Games and announced his retirement from the Tall Blacks immediately after the final.

== Coaching career ==
Book served as an assistant coach for the Nelson Giants in 2013 and 2014.

In March 2022, Book was appointed an assistant coach of the Canterbury Rams. He continued on with the Rams as an assistant in 2023.

== Personal life ==
Book and his wife Lisa have three children: Josh, Amiee and Nic. All three of his children play basketball, while Lisa is a former national league guard and junior Tall Fern.

As of October 2018, Book was a teacher at Waimea College.
