= Matthew Grayling =

New Zealand equestrian

Personal information
- Nickname: Matty G
- Born: 27 September 1963 (age 62)
- Children: Charlotte, Victoria, Phillippa and Callum birth_place =

Sport
- Country: New Zealand
- Sport: Equestrian
- Event: Eventing

Achievements and titles
- Olympic finals: Athens

Matthew Grayling (born 27 September 1963) is a New Zealand equestrian. He competed in eventing at the 2004 Summer Olympics in Athens.
