= Simon Senft =

German fencer (born 1982)

Personal information
- Born: 11 June 1982 (age 44) Cologne, West Germany

Sport
- Sport: Fencing

Simon Senft (born 11 June 1982) is a German fencer. He competed in the team foil event at the 2004 Summer Olympics.
