= Sarah Daninthe =

French fencer (born 1980)

Personal information
- Born: 25 June 1980 (age 46) Les Abymes, Guadeloupe

Sport
- Sport: Fencing
Medal record
Women's fencing
Representing France
Olympic Games
Bronze medal – third place	2004 Athens	Epée team

Sarah Daninthe (born 25 June 1980) is a French fencer from Les Abymes, Guadeloupe, who competed at the 2004 Summer Olympics in the women's team épée and won a bronze medal.
