= Jeanne Hristou =

Greek fencer

Personal information
- Born: 7 January 1981 (age 45)

Sport
- Sport: Fencing

Jeanne Hristou (born 7 January 1981) is a Greek fencer. She competed in the women's individual and team épée events at the 2004 Summer Olympics.
