= Lee Keum-nam =

South Korean fencer

Personal information
- Born: 5 September 1976 (age 49)

Sport
- Sport: Fencing

Lee Keum-nam (born 5 September 1976) is a South Korean fencer. She competed in the épée events at the 1996 and 2004 Summer Olympics.
