= Niki-Katerina Sidiropoulou =

Greek fencer

Personal information
- Nationality: Hellenic
- Born: 11 April 1974 (age 52) Budapest, Hungary

Sport
- Country: Greece, Hungary
- Sport: Fencing
- Event: épée
- Club: A.O. Ariston Paianias
Medal record
Women's épée
Representing Hungary
World Championships Cadet
| Silver medal – second place | 1991 Foggia | Individual |
European Championships U20
| Silver medal – second place | 1992 Innsbruck | Individual |
Representing Greece
European Championships
| Silver medal – second place | 2002 Moscow | Individual |

Niki-Katerina Sidiropoulou (born 11 April 1974) is a Greek épée fencer and silver medalist at European Fencing Championships.

== Career ==
As Niké Szidiropulosz, competing with Hungary, Niki-Katerina Sidiropoulou won the silver medal at the World Championships Cadets in 1991 in Foggia, at the Épée Women's U17 Individual event.

In 1992 she won the silver medal at the European Championships U20, in Innsbruck, Austria, at the Épée Women's U20 Individual event.

During the '90s she won several medals in international competitions, including a bronze medal in Bratislava in 1999 and another bronze medal in Ciudad de Sevilla.

In 2002 she won the silver medal at the 2002 European Fencing Championships in Moscow, at the Épée Women's Senior Individual.

She competed in the women's épée events at the 1996 and 2004 Summer Olympics, taking the 8th place with Greek épée team.

She has been Greek Champion in both individual and team events, and won several other medals in Greek Championships, the last one in 2021.
