= Ángela María Espinosa =

Colombian fencer

Personal information
- Born: 4 January 1974 (age 52) Cali, Colombia

Sport
- Sport: Fencing

Ángela María Espinosa (born 4 January 1974) is a Colombian fencer. She competed in the women's individual épée events at the 2000 and 2004 Summer Olympics.
