= Jessica Eliza Beer =

New Zealand fencer

Personal information
- Born: 20 October 1979 (age 46) Auckland, New Zealand

Sport
- Sport: Fencing

Jessica Eliza Beer (born 20 October 1979) is a New Zealand fencer. As the first female fencer to compete for New Zealand at the Olympics, Beer competed in the women's individual épée event at the 2004 Summer Olympics.
