= Kim Mi-jung (fencer) =

South Korean fencer

Personal information
- Born: 14 May 1977 (age 49)

Sport
- Sport: Fencing

Kim Mi-jung (born 14 May 1977) is a South Korean fencer. She competed in the individual and team épée events at the 2004 Summer Olympics.
