= Dimitra Manganoudaki =

Greek fencer

Dimitra Magkanoudaki
Personal information
- Nationality: Greek
- Born: 26 March 1979 (age 47)

Sport
- Sport: Fencing

Dimitra Magkanoudaki (born 26 March 1979) is a Greek fencer. She competed in the women's individual and team épée events at the 2004 Summer Olympics.
