= Monique Kavelaars =

Canadian fencer (born 1971)

Personal information
- Born: March 20, 1971 (age 55) London, Ontario, Canada

Sport
- Sport: Fencing

Monique Kavelaars (born March 20, 1971) is a Canadian fencer. She was part of Team Canada's women's epée team who finished fourth at the 2004 Summer Olympics in Athens, Greece. She trains and lives in Toronto, Ontario. She belongs to the Toronto Fencing Club.

Kavelaars was Miss Teen Canada in 1989. She has a twin sister named Ingrid Kavelaars who was runner-up in 1987 at that same pageant, but won Miss Teen London Ontario in 1987 and is currently an actress. They also have an older sister named Annette Kavelaars who won the Miss London Ontario pageant in 1984 and competed in the Miss Canada pageant. In total there are five siblings – four daughters and one son, Monique and Ingrid being the youngest. Monique's eldest sister, Marycatherine Kusch, is an accountant. Her brother, JJ Kavelaars, is an astronomer. Their father John is a farmer and mother Anne is a homemaker. They lived in Appin, Ontario.

Her sister Ingrid was a main character on the TV show Jeremiah, which aired from 2002 to 2004. In one episode, Ingrid taught Luke Perry how to fence, alluding to a shared childhood in fencing training. Monique appears in one episode of the show, "Moon in Gemini", playing the twin sister of Ingrid's character. The twins also appeared in the film Senior Trip (1995), as twin sisters Mandy and Candy.

Kavelaars has been married to Andreas Karlsson since June 30, 2004, and lives in Toronto and Sweden.

Kavelaars graduated from the Regina Mundi Catholic College in London, Ontario, and York University in Toronto.
