= Kelly-Anne Wilson =

South African fencer (born 1975)

Personal information
- Born: 7 February 1975 (age 51) Northern Ireland

Sport
- Sport: Fencing

Kelly-Anne Wilson (born 7 February 1975) is a South African fencer. She competed in the women's individual and team épée events at the 2004 Summer Olympics.
