= Rachel Barlow =

South African fencer

Personal information
- Born: 31 March 1982 (age 44) South Africa

Sport
- Sport: Fencing

Rachel Barlow (born 31 March 1982) is a South African fencer. She competed in the women's individual and team épée events at the 2004 Summer Olympics.
