= Natalia Tychler =

South African fencer

Personal information
- Born: 28 July 1973 (age 52) Moscow, Soviet Union

Sport
- Sport: Fencing

Natalia Tychler (born 28 August 1973) is a South African fencer. She competed in the women's individual and team épée events at the 2004 Summer Olympics. She has won multiple national titles, and has represented South Africa four times at the World Championships. Her father-in-law, David Tyshler, won a bronze medal at the 1956 Summer Olympics.
