= National team appearances in the FIBA Women's Basketball World Cup =

The article currently lists the first appearances of the 55 national teams that have made at least one appearance in the FIBA Women's Basketball World Cup, formerly known as the FIBA World Championship for Women, through the 2018 edition.

== Debut of national teams ==
Year	Debutants
1953	Argentina, Brazil, Chile, Cuba, France, Mexico, Paraguay, Peru, Switzerland, United States
1957	Australia, Czechoslovakia, Hungary, Soviet Union
1959	Bulgaria, Poland, Romania, South Korea, Yugoslavia
1964	Japan
1967	East Germany, Italy
1971	Canada, Ecuador, Madagascar
1975	Colombia, Senegal
1979	Bolivia, Malaysia, Netherlands
1983	China, Zaire
1986	Chinese Taipei
1990	–
1994	Kenya, New Zealand, Slovakia, Spain
1998	Germany, Lithuania, Russia
2002	FR Yugoslavia, Tunisia
2006	Czech Republic, Nigeria
2010	Belarus, Greece, Mali
2014	Angola, Mozambique, Serbia, Turkey
2018	Belgium, Latvia, Puerto Rico
2022	Bosnia and Herzegovina
2026	–

== Comprehensive team results ==
Team	(Chile) 1953	(Brazil) 1957	(Soviet Union) 1959	(Peru) 1964	(Czechoslovakia) 1967	(Brazil) 1971	(Colombia) 1975	(South Korea) 1979	(Brazil) 1983	(Soviet Union) 1986	(Malaysia) 1990	(Australia) 1994	(Germany) 1998	(China) 2002	(Brazil) 2006	(Czech Republic) 2010	(Turkey) 2014	(Spain) 2018	(Australia) 2022	(Germany) 2026	(Japan) 2030	Total
Angola	–	–	–	–	–	–	–	–	–	–	–	–	–	–	–	–	16th	–	–	–		1
Argentina	6th	9th	–	13th	–	11th	–	–	–	–	–	–	15th	10th	9th	14th	–	15th	–	–		9
Australia	–	10th	–	–	10th	9th	10th	4th	11th	9th	6th	4th	3rd	3rd	1st	5th	3rd	2nd	3rd	6th		17
Belarus	–	–	–	–	–	–	–	–	–	–	–	–	–	–	–	4th	10th	–	–	–		2
Belgium	–	–	–	–	–	–	–	–	–	–	–	–	–	–	–	–	–	4th	5th	5th		3
Bolivia	–	–	–	–	–	–	–	10th	–	–	–	–	–	–	–	–	–	–	–	–		1
Bosnia and Herzegovina	–	–	–	–	–	–	–	–	–	–	–	–	–	–	–	–	–	–	12th	–		1
Brazil	4th	4th	–	5th	8th	3rd	12th	9th	5th	11th	10th	1st	4th	7th	4th	9th	11th	–	–	–		16
Bulgaria	–	–	2nd	3rd	7th	–	–	WD	6th	7th	8th	–	–	–	–	–	–	–	–	–		6
Canada	–	–	–	–	–	10th	11th	3rd	9th	3rd	7th	7th	–	–	10th	12th	5th	7th	4th	–		12
Chile	2nd	7th	–	11th	–	–	–	–	–	–	–	–	–	–	–	–	–	–	–	–		3
China	–	–	–	–	–	–	–	WD	3rd	5th	9th	2nd	12th	6th	12th	13th	6th	6th	2nd	7th		12
Chinese Taipei	–	–	–	–	–	–	–	–	–	12th	–	14th	–	14th	14th	–	–	–	–	–		4
Colombia	–	–	–	–	–	–	7th	–	–	–	–	–	–	–	–	–	–	–	–	–		1
DR Congo	–	–	–	–	–	–	–	–	14th	–	15th	–	16th	–	–	–	–	–	–	–		3
Cuba	10th	12th	–	–	–	7th	–	–	10th	6th	3rd	6th	7th	9th	11th	–	12th	–	–	–		9
Czech Republic	–	–	–	–	–	–	–	–	–	–	–	–	–	–	7th	2nd	9th	–	–	15th		4
Czechoslovakia †	–	3rd	3rd	2nd	3rd	2nd	3rd	WD	–	4th	4th	–	–	–	–	–	–	–	–	–	–	8
East Germany †	–	–	–	–	4th	–	–	–	–	–	–	–	–	–	–	–	–	–	–	–	–	1
Ecuador	–	–	–	–	–	12th	–	–	–	–	–	–	–	–	–	–	–	–	–	–		1
France	3rd	–	–	10th	–	6th	–	7th	–	–	–	9th	–	8th	5th	6th	7th	5th	7th	2nd		12
Germany	–	–	–	–	–	–	–	–	–	–	–	–	11th	–	–	–	–	–	–	4th		2
Greece	–	–	–	–	–	–	–	–	–	–	–	–	–	–	–	11th	–	11th	–	–		2
Hungary	–	5th	7th	–	–	–	9th	–	–	8th	–	–	10th	–	–	–	–	–	–	8th		6
Italy	–	–	–	–	9th	–	4th	5th	–	–	13th	11th	–	–	–	–	–	–	–	9th		6
Japan	–	–	–	9th	5th	5th	2nd	6th	12th	–	12th	12th	9th	13th	–	10th	14th	9th	9th	12th	Q	16
Kenya	–	–	–	–	–	–	–	–	–	–	–	16th	–	–	–	–	–	–	–	–		1
Latvia	–	–	–	–	–	–	–	–	–	–	–	–	–	–	–	–	–	13th	–	–		1
Lithuania	–	–	–	–	–	–	–	–	–	–	–	–	6th	11th	6th	–	–	–	–	–		3
Madagascar	–	–	–	–	–	13th	–	–	–	–	–	–	–	–	–	–	–	–	–	–		1
Malaysia	–	–	–	–	–	–	–	11th	–	–	16th	–	–	–	–	–	–	–	–	–		2
Mali	–	–	–	–	–	–	–	–	–	–	–	–	–	–	–	15th	–	–	11th	13th		3
Mexico	8th	8th	–	–	–	–	6th	WD	–	–	–	–	–	–	–	–	–	–	–	–		3
Mozambique	–	–	–	–	–	–	–	–	–	–	–	–	–	–	–	–	15th	–	–	–		1
Netherlands	–	–	–	–	–	–	–	8th	–	–	–	–	–	–	–	–	–	–	–	–		1
New Zealand	–	–	–	–	–	–	–	–	–	–	–	15th	–	–	–	–	–	–	–	–		1
Nigeria	–	–	–	–	–	–	–	–	–	–	–	–	–	–	16th	–	–	8th	WD	16th		3
Paraguay	5th	6th	–	12th	–	–	–	–	–	–	–	–	–	–	–	–	–	–	–	–		3
Peru	7th	11th	–	7th	–	–	–	–	13th	–	–	–	–	–	–	–	–	–	–	–		4
Poland	–	–	5th	–	–	–	–	–	7th	–	–	13th	–	–	–	–	–	–	–	–		3
Puerto Rico	–	–	–	–	–	–	–	–	–	–	–	–	–	–	–	–	–	16th	8th	11th		3
Romania	–	–	6th	–	–	–	–	–	–	–	–	–	–	–	–	–	–	–	–	–		1
Russia	–	–	–	–	–	–	–	–	–	–	–	–	2nd	2nd	2nd	7th	–	–	DQ	DQ		4
Senegal	–	–	–	–	–	–	13th	12th	WD	–	14th	WD	14th	15th	15th	16th	–	12th	–	–		8
Serbia	–	–	–	–	–	–	–	–	–	–	–	–	–	–	–	–	8th	–	6th	–		2
Slovakia	–	–	–	–	–	–	–	–	–	–	–	5th	8th	–	–	–	–	–	–	–		2
South Korea	–	–	8th	8th	2nd	4th	5th	2nd	4th	10th	11th	10th	13th	4th	13th	8th	13th	14th	10th	10th		18
Soviet Union †	–	2nd	1st	1st	1st	1st	1st	WD	1st	2nd	5th	–	–	–	–	–	–	–	–	–	–	9
Spain	–	–	–	–	–	–	–	–	–	–	–	8th	5th	5th	8th	3rd	2nd	3rd	–	3rd		8
Switzerland	9th	–	–	–	–	–	–	–	–	–	–	–	–	–	–	–	–	–	–	–		1
Tunisia	–	–	–	–	–	–	–	–	–	–	–	–	–	16th	–	–	–	–	–	–		1
Turkey	–	–	–	–	–	–	–	–	–	–	–	–	–	–	–	–	4th	10th	–	14th		3
United States	1st	1st	–	4th	11th	8th	8th	1st	2nd	1st	1st	3rd	1st	1st	3rd	1st	1st	1st	1st	1st		19
Yugoslavia †	–	–	4th	6th	6th	–	–	WD	8th	–	2nd	–	–	12th	–	–	–	–	–	–	–	6
Total	10	12	8	13	11	13	13	12	14	12	16	16	16	16	16	16	16	16	12	16	16	

== Ranking of teams by number of appearances ==
Team	App	Record streak	Active streak	Debut	Most recent	Best result (* hosts)
United States	18	16	16	1953	2022	Champions (1953, 1957, 1979, 1986, 1990, 1998, 2002, 2010, 2014, 2018, 2022)
South Korea	17	17	17	1959	2022	Runners-up (1967, 1979*)
Brazil	16	14	0	1953	2014	Champions (1994)
Australia	16	15	15	1957	2022	Champions (2006)
Japan	14	6	4	1964	2022	Runners-up (1975)
Canada	12	7	5	1971	2022	Third place (1979, 1986)
Cuba	11	7	0	1953	2014	Third place (1990)
China	11	11	11	1983	2022	Runners-up (1994, 2022)
France	11	6	6	1953	2022	Third place (1953)
Soviet Union †	9	6	–	1957	1990	Champions (1959*, 1964, 1967, 1971, 1975, 1983)
Argentina	9	4	0	1953	2018	6th (1953)
Czechoslovakia †	8	6	–	1957	1990	Runners-up (1964, 1971)
Senegal	8	4	0	1975	2018	12th (1979, 2018)
Spain	7	7	0	1994	2018	Runners-up (2014)
Bulgaria	6	3	0	1959	1990	Runners-up (1959)
Yugoslavia †	6	3	–	1959	2002	Runners-up (1990)
Italy	5	2	0	1967	1994	Fourth place (1975)
Hungary	5	2	0	1957	1998	5th (1957)
Peru	4	2	0	1953	1983	7th (1953, 1964*)
Chinese Taipei	4	2	0	1986	2006	12th (1986)
Russia	4	4	0	1998	2010	Runners-up (1998, 2002, 2006)
Chile	3	2	0	1953	1964	Runners-up (1953*)
Paraguay	3	2	0	1953	1964	5th (1953)
Mexico	3	2	0	1953	1975	6th (1979)
Poland	3	1	0	1959	1994	5th (1959)
DR Congo	3	1	0	1983	1998	14th (1983)
Lithuania	3	3	0	1998	2006	6th (1998, 2006)
Czech Republic	3	3	0	2006	2014	Runners-up (2010*)
Germany	2	1	0	1998	2026	11th (1998)
Malaysia	2	1	0	1979	1990	11th (1979)
Slovakia	2	2	0	1994	1998	5th (1994)
Belarus	2	2	0	2010	2014	Fourth place (2010)
Nigeria	2	1	0	2006	2018	8th (2018)
Greece	2	1	0	2010	2018	11th (2010, 2018)
Turkey	2	2	0	2014	2018	Fourth place (2014*)
Mali	2	1	1	2010	2022	11th (2022)
Serbia	2	1	1	2014	2022	6th (2022)
Belgium	2	2	2	2018	2022	Fourth place (2018)
Puerto Rico	2	2	2	2018	2022	8th (2022)
Switzerland	1	1	0	1953	1953	9th (1953)
Romania	1	1	0	1959	1959	6th (1959)
East Germany †	1	1	–	1967	1967	Fourth place (1967)
Ecuador	1	1	0	1971	1971	12th (1971*)
Madagascar	1	1	0	1971	1971	13th (1971)
Colombia	1	1	0	1975	1975	7th (1975*)
Bolivia	1	1	0	1979	1979	10th (1979)
Netherlands	1	1	0	1979	1979	8th (1979)
Kenya	1	1	0	1994	1994	16th (1994)
New Zealand	1	1	0	1994	1994	15th (1994)
Tunisia	1	1	0	2002	2002	16th (2002)
Angola	1	1	0	2014	2014	16th (2014)
Mozambique	1	1	0	2014	2014	15th (2014)
Latvia	1	1	0	2018	2018	13th (2018)
Bosnia and Herzegovina	1	1	1	2022	2022	12th (2022)

== Overall won/lost records from 1953 to 2022 ==
Team	App	Played	Won	Lost	%
United States	18	138	117	21	84.8%
Australia	16	120	76	44	63.3%
Soviet Union †	9	73	69	4	94.5%
Brazil	17	115	61	54	53%
South Korea	17	118	56	62	47.5%
Canada	12	90	46	44	51.1%
China	11	85	46	39	54.1%
Czechoslovakia †	8	63	45	18	71.4%
France	11	86	44	42	51.2%
Japan	14	96	35	61	36.5%
Cuba	11	82	35	47	42.7%
Spain	7	57	35	22	61.4%
Bulgaria	6	46	28	18	60.9%
Russia	4	36	26	10	72.2%
Yugoslavia †	6	48	20	28	41.7%
Italy	5	37	19	18	51.4%
Argentina	9	58	18	40	31%
Hungary	5	38	14	24	36.8%
Czech Republic	3	22	13	9	59.1%
Poland	3	24	12	12	50%
Lithuania	3	26	11	15	42.3%
Mexico	3	20	10	10	50%
Chile	3	23	9	14	39.1%
Slovakia	2	17	9	8	52.9%
Paraguay	3	25	8	17	32%
Senegal	8	45	6	39	13.3%
Belarus	2	13	6	7	46.2%
Serbia	2	13	6	7	46.2%
Belgium	2	12	6	6	50%
Peru	4	26	5	21	19.2%
Turkey	2	10	5	5	50%
Chinese Taipei	4	25	4	21	16%
Greece	2	12	4	8	33.3%
East Germany †	1	7	4	3	57.1%
Netherlands	1	6	4	2	66.7%
Nigeria	2	12	3	9	25%
Germany	1	8	3	5	37.5%
Puerto Rico	2	9	2	7	22.2%
Romania	1	7	2	5	28.6%
Bolivia	1	6	2	4	33.3%
DR Congo	3	20	1	19	5%
Malaysia	2	14	1	13	7.1%
Mali	2	10	1	9	10%
Ecuador	1	8	1	7	12.5%
New Zealand	1	8	1	7	12.5%
Switzerland	1	5	1	4	20%
Kenya	1	8	0	8	0%
Madagascar	1	8	0	8	0%
Colombia	1	6	0	6	0%
Bosnia and Herzegovina	1	5	0	5	0%
Tunisia	1	5	0	5	0%
Angola	1	3	0	3	0%
Latvia	1	3	0	3	0%
Mozambique	1	3	0	3	0%
