= Jenny Cheesman =

Australian basketball player

Jenny Cheesman AM
Personal information
- Born: 2 November 1957 (age 69) Adelaide, South Australia

Jennifer Cheesman AM (born 2 November 1957) is an Australian former basketball player and coach.

== Biography ==
Cheesman played 167 games for the national team between 1975 and 1988, competing at two Olympic Games, in 1984 and 1988. Cheesman described making the 1984 Olympic Games as "a life-long dream come true... Since I was twelve years old my aim has been to play basketball at an Olympic Games". At the 1984 Los Angeles Olympic Games, Cheesman and her husband, Phil Smyth, became the first husband and wife to captain Australian teams at the same Olympics.

Cheesman also represented Australia at four World Championships, in 1975, 1979, 1983, and 1986. She was the captain of the team from 1980 until the end of her career and went on to be the Opals assistant coach from 1993 to 2000. While she was still playing at the highest level with the Opals, Cheesman was an assistant coach with the AIS program, taking over the head coach role for one year in 1990. As a talented junior, Cheesman eventually had to choose between stellar basketball and netball careers. Cheesman was an assistant coach with the Opals at 2000 Sydney Olympics.

Cheesman won the Halls Medal for the best and fairest player in the South Australian state league on three occasions; 1974, 1977 and 1978. In 1985, Cheesman was named the most valuable player of the Women's Basketball Conference playing for the Canberra Capitals. She continued with the Capitals following their move to the Women's National Basketball League.

In the 1989 Queen's Birthday Honours, Cheesman was appointed a Member of the Order of Australia for her contribution to basketball. She was awarded the Australian Sports Medal in 2000.

In 2003, Basketball Australia introduced an annual Fair Play Award to all Australian Junior Championships. The Under 14 Girls Club Championship award for fair play was named the "Jenny Cheesman Fair Play Award", as recognition of her outstanding contribution to the game. Although Cheesman was not involved in any international medal winning teams, she was described a very important figure in the development of Australian women's basketball. Cheesman has been described as "a truly world-class basketball player". Cheesman was inducted into the Australian Basketball Hall of Fame in 2004. In 2006, Cheesman polled as the eighth greatest Australian female player in the 25-year team.

== See also ==
- Australia men's national basketball team
