= Jill Hammond =

Australian basketball player (born 1950)

Personal information
- Born: 25 August 1950 (age 76) Melbourne, Victoria
Medal record
Women's Basketball
Representing Australia

Jill Maree Hammond (born 25 August 1950) is a former Australian women's basketball player.

== Biography ==
Hammond played for the national team between 1970 and 1980, competing at three World Championship; 1971, 1975 and 1979. At 180 cm (5 ft 11 in) tall, Hammond played as a Forward. Hammond was captain of the 1975 and 1979 squads and was considered a standout player for Australia during the 1970s. Hammond's lifelong ambition of playing basketball at an Olympic Games were dashed when following the 1980 pre-Olympic Qualification Tournament, the Opals failed in their bid to qualify for the Moscow Olympics.

Playing most of her career in an era before the creation of the Women's National Basketball League (WNBL) in 1981, Hammond played for the North Adelaide Rockets, winning the Merv Harris (MVP) Trophy in 1977 and 1978. In 1979, Hammond won the Halls Medal for the best and fairest player in the South Australian Women's competition. Hammond retired from the WNBL after the 1983 season having played 49 games.

Hammond was inducted into Basketball Victoria Wall of Fame in 1990.
