= Pat Rowe =

Australian basketball player

Personal information
- Born: 10 December 1939 (age 86) Adelaide, South Australia
Medal record
Women's Basketball
Representing Australia

Patricia Rowe (born 10 December 1939) is an Australian former women's basketball player.

== Biography ==
Rowe played for the Australia women's national basketball team during the 1960s and early 1970s and competed for Australia at the 1967 World Championship held in Czechoslovakia and 1971 World Championship held in Brazil. Rowe was captain of both the 1967 and 1971 squads. In 1962, Rowe was awarded the Halls Medal, for the Fairest and most Brilliant player in South Australia. Rowe's daughter, Marisa Rowe, represented Australia at the 1986 World Championship held in the Soviet Union.
