= Sandra Tomlinson =

Australian basketball player

Personal information
- Born: 1947 (age 78–79) Melbourne, Victoria
Medal record
Women's Basketball
Representing Australia

Sandra Tomlinson (born c. 1947) is a former Australian women's basketball player.

== Biography ==
Tomlinson played for the Australia women's national basketball team during the 1970s and competed for Australia at the 1971 World Championship held in Brazil and the 1975 World Championship held in Colombia. In 2009, Tomlinson stated that playing professional basketball in the 1970s was difficult because they had to fund their own way to the World Championships, so some of the best players couldn't afford to go.

Prior to the creation of the Australian Women's National Basketball League (WNBL) in 1981, Tomlinson played for the Melbourne Telstars and Melbourne Tigers. In the WNBL, Tomlinson played one season for the CYMS Comets, in 1982, before retiring.

Tomlinson is married to former triple-Olympian basketballer, Ray Tomlinson and three of their four daughters have played college basketball in the United States. In 1989, Tomlinson and former Opals teammate, Karin McRobert, formed the Masters basketball team, the Jayco Butterflies.
