= Marisa Rowe =

Australian basketball player

Personal information
- Born: 16 July 1963 (age 63) Adelaide, South Australia
Medal record
Women's Basketball
Representing Australia

Marisa Rowe (born 16 July 1963) is a former Australian women's basketball player.

== Biography ==
Rowe was a member of the national team roster during the 1980s and competed for Australia at the 1986 World Championship held in the Soviet Union. In the domestic Women's National Basketball League (WNBL) Rowe played 151 games for AIS (1981–82), Melbourne East (1983–84), St Kilda Saints (1985), Geelong Supercats (1986) and Coburg Cougars (1987–89). Rowe's mother, Pat Rowe, was captain of the Australian squads that competed at the 1967 World Championship held in Czechoslovakia and 1971 World Championship held in Brazil.
