= Sue Harcus =

Australian basketball player and coach

Personal information
- Born: 11 December 1954 (age 71) Perth, Western Australia
Medal record
Women's Basketball
Representing Australia

Susan Harcus (born 11 December 1954) is an Australian former basketball player and coach.

== Biography ==
Harcus played for the Australia women's national basketball team during the 1970s and competed for Australia at the 1975 World Championship held in Colombia.

Harcus left Perth at 16 years old to play basketball in Adelaide, where the competition was stronger. Three years later, at 19, she first made the national side. Playing in an era before the creation of the Women's National Basketball League (WNBL) in 1981, Harcus played for West Torrens in the South Australian competition. She won the Halls Medal for the best and fairest player in the South Australian competition on two occasions; 1976 and 1980.

In 1984, Harcus returned to Western Australia, where she began coaching women's basketball teams. Harcus would go on to become an assistant coach of the Opals under the guidance of head coach Robbie Cadee.
