= Jean Bain =

Australian basketball player

Personal information
- Born: Adelaide, South Australia
Medal record
Women's Basketball
Representing Australia

Jean Bain (née Marshall) is a retired Australian women's basketball and lacrosse player.

Bain played for the Australia women's national basketball team during the late 1960s and early 1970s and competed for Australia at the 1967 World Championship held in South Korea and the 1971 World Championship held in Brazil.

Following her retirement, Bain went on to become a successful junior basketball coach in South Australia.

Bain was also a successful lacrosse player and was captain of the first Australia women's national lacrosse team in a tri-series against England and the United States in 1969. As a teacher at Seacombe High School, she recruited and coached many players for the Seacombe Lacrosse Club
