= Julie Gross =

Australian basketball player

Personal information
- Born: 27 March 1957 (age 69) Tatura, Victoria
Medal record
Women's Basketball
Representing Australia

Julie Gross (born 27 March 1957) is a retired Australian women's basketball player.

== Biography ==
Gross played for the national team during the 1970s, competing for Australia at two World Championships; 1975 held in Columbia and 1979 held in South Korea.

In 1978, Gross moved to the United States where she played basketball for Louisiana State University. In her first season with the Tigers, Gross became LSU's first Kodak All-American. Gross finished her career as the all-time leading rebounder in LSU history with 1,466 rebounds and was second on the all-time scoring list with 2,488 points. Gross and Maree Bennie (now Jackson), were the first Australian females to win All-American honours while playing college basketball in the United States.

=== LSU statistics ===
Legend
GP	Games played	GS	Games started	MPG	Minutes per game
FG%	Field goal percentage	3P%	3-point field goal percentage	FT%	Free throw percentage
RPG	Rebounds per game	APG	Assists per game	SPG	Steals per game
BPG	Blocks per game	PPG	Points per game	**Bold**	Career high

Year	Team	GP	Points	FG%	FT%	RPG	PPG
1976–77	LSU	37	685	52.6%	**71.5%**	**12.2**	18.5
1977–78	LSU	**40**	**828**	**53.1%**	70.8%	11.5	**20.7**
1978–79	LSU	24	447	48.9%	63.0%	10.8	18.6
1979–80	LSU	30	528	51.2%	71.4%	9.5	17.6
TOTALS		131	2488	51.8%	69.9%	11.2	18.9
