= Diane Cook (disambiguation) =

Diane Cook (born 1976) is an American writer.

Diane or Dianne Cook may also refer to:

- Diane Cook (photographer), American photographer
- Diane G. Cook, American Parkinson's disease advocate
- Diane J. Cook, American computer scientist
- Dianne Cook (basketball) (born 1951), former Australian women's basketball player
- Dianne Cook (statistician), Australian statistician
