= Maree Jackson =

Australian basketball player

Personal information
- Born: 11 October 1954 (age 71) Tallangatta, Victoria
- Height: 6ft 2in (188cm)
Medal record
Women's Basketball
Representing Australia

Maree Jackson (née Bennie) (born 11 October 1954) is a retired Australian basketball player.

== Biography ==
The 6 ft 2in Jackson played for the Australia women's national basketball team during the 1970s and competed for Australia at the 1975 World Championship held in Colombia and the 1979 World Championship held in South Korea.

Following a 1976 tour of the United States with the New South Wales state basketball team, Jackson accepted a physical education scholarship to play basketball with Louisiana State University. As a sophomore in 1978, Jackson scored 1,021 points (25.5 ppg) and grabbed 539 rebounds (13.5 rpg). The 1,021 points and 539 rebounds are the most in both Southeastern Conference (SEC) and LSU history for one season. In just two seasons with the Lady Tigers, Jackson scored 1,852 points which places her third on the all-time scoring list. She also finished her career as the second leading rebounder in LSU history with 1,032 rebounds. For her career, Jackson averaged 26.4 points a game, which still stands as the SEC record.

Jackson and Julie Gross were the first Australian females to win All-American honours while playing college basketball in the United States. That year, Jackson also won a place in the US national side. Jackson turned down several lucrative offers to turn professional so she could return to Australia to play for the Opals at 1980 Moscow Olympics. However, following the pre-Olympic Qualification Tournament, the Opals failed in their bid to qualify for the games.

Following a women's national tournament in Sydney in 1972, Jackson met fellow Australian basketballer and future husband, Gary Jackson. Their first-born, Lauren Jackson, would become the number 1 pick in the 2001 WNBA draft and would go on to become Australia's most successful and decorated basketball player.

In 2006, Maree Jackson was inducted into Australia's Basketball Hall of Fame. The National Junior Championship trophy for under 18 women is also named in her honour.

=== LSU statistics ===
Legend
GP	Games played	GS	Games started	MPG	Minutes per game
FG%	Field goal percentage	3P%	3-point field goal percentage	FT%	Free throw percentage
RPG	Rebounds per game	APG	Assists per game	SPG	Steals per game
BPG	Blocks per game	PPG	Points per game	**Bold**	Career high

Year	Team	GP	Points	FG%	FT%	RPG	PPG
1976-77	LSU	30	831	**68.9%**	67.5%	**16.4**	**27.7**
1977-78	LSU	**40**	**1021**	62.3%	**75.5%**	13.5	25.5
TOTALS		70	1852	65.1%	71.9%	14.7	26.4
