= Rose Verzeletti =

Rose Marie Broomhead (née Verzeletti; 12 March 1948 – 5 December 2024) was an Australian basketball player.

Originally from Ingham, Queensland, Verzeletti was a competitive basketball player in Townsville throughout the 1970’s, captaining the Lakers and leading the team to 13 consecutive wins.

Verzeletti made her debut at the 1969 Australian Championships before going on to represent Australia as part of the 1971 national women's squad at the 1971 World Championships in Sao Paulo in Brazil. Verzeletti was the tallest member of the team, with a height of 6ft 3in.

She died on 5 December 2024. Her funeral was held in Buderim on 16 December 2024.
