= Carole Waters =

Australian basketball player

Medal record
Women's Basketball
Representing Australia

Carole Waters is a retired Australian women's basketball player.

She played for the Australia women's national basketball team during the late 1960s and early 1970s and competed for Australia at the 1967 World Championship held in Czechoslovakia and the 1971 World Championship held in Brazil. Waters is married to veteran cyclist Roger Stoddart.
