= Patricia Mickan =

Australian basketball player

Personal information
- Born: 12 March 1957 (age 69) Renmark, South Australia
- Height: 179 cm (5 ft 10 in)
- Weight: 79 kg (174 lb)

Sport
- Country: Australia
- Sport: Women's basketball

Patricia "Pat" Mickan (born 12 March 1957) is an Australian former basketball player.

== Biography ==
Mickan played 150 games for the national team between 1979 and 1989, competing at two Olympic Games, 1984 and 1988. Mickan described her Olympic memories; "I get goose bumps when thinking about it, it's just a very rare and precious experience". Mickan also represented Australia at three World Championships - 1979, 1983, and 1986.

Following her retirement, Mickan went on to become a successful state senior netball and basketball coach. Breaking the barrier for women in sport, Mickan also became the first female specialist skills coach in the Australian Football League with the Adelaide Crows. Her younger brother, Mark, is a former AFL footballer.

She then went on to have her daughter, Sydney, with her husband Lewis. Later they adopted a son from Ethiopia named Reuben. Mickan is also a freelance writer and keynote speaker. In 2013, Mickan was elected to the Australian Basketball Hall of Fame.
