= Sharon Deacon =

Australian basketball player

Personal information
- Born: 30 November 1957 (age 68) Korumburra, Victoria
Medal record
Women's Basketball
Representing Australia

Sharon Deacon (née Amiet) (born 30 November 1957) is a former Australian women's basketball player.

== Biography ==
Deacon played for the Australia women's national basketball team during the late 1970s and early 1980s and competed for Australia at the 1979 World Championship held in South Korea and the 1983 World Championship held in Brazil. In the domestic Women's National Basketball League (WNBL), Deacon played 112 games for the Melbourne Telstars (1981) and Melbourne East Spectres (1982 – 1990).
