= Jan Bowman =

Australian basketball player (born 1953)

Personal information
- Born: 20 November 1953 (age 72) Brisbane, Queensland
Medal record
Women's Basketball
Representing Australia

Janice (Jan) Faye Bowman (born 20 November 1953) is a retired Australian women's basketball player.

== Biography ==
Bowman played for the Australia women's national basketball team during the 1970s and competed for Australia at the 1975 World Championship held in Colombia. At the Championship, Bowman contracted German measles the day of the first game and was put into isolation for the rest of the tournament. At 182 cm (6 ft 0 in) tall, Bowman played Centre. Bowman played in an era before the creation of the Women's National Basketball League in 1981. Although Bowman was born in Brisbane, she played for Victoria at the national (state v state) basketball championships.
