= Italy women's national basketball team =

Italy
- FIBA ranking: 14 (18 March 2026)
- FIBA zone: FIBA Europe
- National federation: Italian Basketball Federation
- Coach: Andrea Capobianco

Olympic Games
- Appearances: 3

World Cup
- Appearances: 6

EuroBasket
- Appearances: 35
- Medals: Gold: (1938); Silver: (1995); Bronze: (1974, 2025)

Mediterranean Games
- Appearances: 4
- Medals: Gold: (2009); Silver: (1993, 2001)
Home	Away

The Italy women's national basketball team (Italian: Nazionale di pallacanestro femminile dell'Italia) represents Italy in international women's basketball competitions. At the European Women's Basketball Championship the Italian team won Gold medals in 1938.

Italy is the leading nation in terms of EuroBasket Women qualifications. (Alongside France)

== Honours ==
Competition	1st place, gold medalist(s)	2nd place, silver medalist(s)	3rd place, bronze medalist(s)	Total
Olympic Games	0	0	0	0
Women's World Cup	0	0	0	0
EuroBasket Women	1	1	2	4
Universiade	1	1	0	2
Mediterranean Games	1	2	0	3
Total	3	4	2	9

== Competition record ==
Results in final tournaments and qualifying games

=== Olympic Games ===
Olympic Games					Qualifying		
Year	Position	Pld	W	L	Pld	W	L
(Canada) 1976	Did not qualify				4	1	3
(Soviet Union) 1980	6th	5	0	5	9	6	3
(United States) 1984	Did not qualify				4	2	2
(South Korea) 1988	Did not qualify				11	5	6
(Spain) 1992	8th	5	0	5	8	5	3
(United States) 1996	8th	8	3	5			
(Australia) 2000	Did not qualify						
(Greece) 2004	Did not qualify						
(China) 2008	Did not qualify						
(United Kingdom) 2012	Did not qualify						
(Brazil) 2016	Did not qualify						
(Japan) 2020	Did not qualify						
(France) 2024	Did not qualify						
(United States) 2028	To be determined				To be determined		
Total		18	3	15	36	19	17

=== FIBA World Cup ===
Women's World Cup
Year	Position	Pld	W	L
(Chile) 1953	Did not qualify			
(Brazil) 1957	Did not qualify			
(Soviet Union) 1959	Did not qualify			
(Peru) 1964	Did not qualify			
(Czechoslovakia) 1967	9th	6	1	5
(Brazil) 1971	Did not qualify			
(Colombia) 1975	4th	8	5	3
(South Korea) 1979	5th	7	3	4
(Brazil) 1983	Did not qualify			
(Soviet Union) 1986	Did not qualify			
(Malaysia) 1990	13th	8	5	3
(Australia) 1994	11th	8	5	3
(Germany) 1998	Did not qualify			
(China) 2002	Did not qualify			
(Brazil) 2006	Did not qualify			
(Czech Republic) 2010	Did not qualify			
(Turkey) 2014	Did not qualify			
(Spain) 2018	Did not qualify			
(Australia) 2022	Did not qualify			
(Germany) 2026	9th	4	1	3
(Japan) 2030	To be determined			
Total		41	20	21

=== EuroBasket Women ===
EuroBasket Women					Qualification		
Year	Position	Pld	W	L	Pld	W	L
(Italy) 1938	Gold medal	4	3	1			
(Hungary) 1950	5th	7	3	4			
(Soviet Union) 1952	6th	5	2	3			
(Socialist Federal Republic of Yugoslavia) 1954	7th	6	5	1			
(Czechoslovakia) 1956	6th	8	3	5			
(Poland) 1958	Did not qualify						
(Bulgaria) 1960	7th	7	5	2			
(France) 1962	9th	5	1	4	7	5	2
(Hungary) 1964	9th	5	1	4	2	2	0
(Romania) 1966	10th	7	2	5	2	2	0
(Italy) 1968	6th	6	2	4			
(Netherlands) 1970	9th	7	2	5	3	2	1
(Bulgaria) 1972	10th	8	2	6	5	4	1
(Italy) 1974	Bronze medal	6	3	3			
(France) 1976	7th	7	3	4			
(Poland) 1978	9th	5	2	3			
(Socialist Federal Republic of Yugoslavia) 1980	9th	7	5	2			
(Italy) 1981	7th	7	3	4			
(Hungary) 1983	5th	7	4	3	4	4	0
(Italy) 1985	7th	7	3	4			
(Spain) 1987	5th	7	4	3	3	3	0
(Bulgaria) 1989	5th	5	3	2	5	5	0
(Israel) 1991	7th	5	2	3	5	5	0
(Italy) 1993	4th	5	3	2	5	5	0
(Czech Republic) 1995	Silver medal	9	8	1	5	4	1
(Hungary) 1997	11th	7	2	5			
(Poland) 1999	11th	7	3	4	5	3	2
(France) 2001	Did not qualify				6	3	3
(Greece) 2003	Did not qualify				6	1	5
(Turkey) 2005	Did not qualify				6	1	5
(Italy) 2007	9th	6	2	4	4	3	1
(Latvia) 2009	6th	9	4	5	12	6	6
(Poland) 2011	Did not qualify				8	5	3
(France) 2013	8th	9	3	6	8	7	1
(Hungary) (Romania) 2015	15th	4	1	3	6	4	2
(Czech Republic) 2017	7th	7	4	3	6	5	1
(Serbia) (Latvia) 2019	9th	4	2	2	6	5	1
(France) (Spain) 2021	9th	4	2	2	6	5	1
(Slovenia) (Israel) 2023	9th	4	1	3	6	6	0
(Czech Republic) (Germany) (Greece) (Italy) 2025	Bronze medal	6	5	1	Qualified as host		
(Belgium) (Finland) (Sweden) (Lithuania) 2027	To be determined				To be determined		
Total		219	102	117	131	95	36

== Team ==
=== Current roster ===
Roster for the 2026 FIBA Women's Basketball World Cup.

Italy women's national basketball team roster
Players
Coaches

Pos.	No.	Name	Age – Date of birth	Height	Club	Ctr.
PF	0	Jasmine Keys	28 – 8 October 1997	1.90 m (6 ft 3 in)	PF Schio	(Italy)
PG	5	Matilde Villa	21 – 9 December 2004	1.72 m (5 ft 8 in)	Reyer Venezia	(Italy)
G	6	Francesca Pasa	26 – 22 May 2000	1.75 m (5 ft 9 in)	Reyer Venezia	(Italy)
SG	8	Costanza Verona	27 – 6 August 1999	1.70 m (5 ft 7 in)	PF Schio	(Italy)
SF	9	Cecilia Zandalasini	30 – 16 March 1996	1.86 m (6 ft 1 in)	Golden State Valkyries	(United States)
SF	11	Francesca Pan	29 – 27 May 1997	1.83 m (6 ft 0 in)	Reyer Venezia	(Italy)
C	13	Lorela Cubaj	27 – 8 January 1999	1.92 m (6 ft 4 in)	Reyer Venezia	(Italy)
PF	14	Sara Madera	26 – 28 June 2000	1.87 m (6 ft 2 in)	Magnolia Basket Campobasso	(Italy)
PG	18	Mariella Santucci	29 – 18 June 1997	1.70 m (5 ft 7 in)	Reyer Venezia	(Italy)
SG	19	Martina Fassina	27 – 7 April 1999	1.83 m (6 ft 0 in)	CB Avenida	(Spain)
C	22	Olbis Andrè (C)	27 – 25 December 1998	1.92 m (6 ft 4 in)	PF Schio	(Italy)
PG	55	Vittoria Blasigh	22 – 7 April 2004	1.75 m (5 ft 9 in)	UCF Knights	(United States)

Head coach

- (Italy) Andrea Capobianco

Assistant coach(es)

- (Italy) Vincenzo Di Meglio
- (Italy) Angela Gianolla

Legend

- (C) Team captain
- Club – describes last
  club before the tournament
- Age – describes age
  on 4 September 2026

=== Head coach position ===
- Roberto Ricchini – 2011–2015
- Andrea Capobianco – 2015–

== See also ==
- Italy women's national under-19 basketball team
- Italy women's national under-17 basketball team
- Italy women's national 3x3 team
