= Jean Forster =

Australian basketball player

No. 7 – Melbourne Comets, Victoria
- Position: Power forward
- League: Basketball Victoria

Personal information
- Born: c. 1943 Melbourne, Victoria, Australia
- Listed height: 5 ft 6 in (1.68 m)

Career highlights
- Australian Basketball Hall of Fame (2016); Basketball Victoria Hall of Fame (1990); Opals Captain (1967); Australian Championships B&F (1963)

Jean Forster (née Kupsc) is a retired Australian women's basketball player.

== Biography ==
Forster was born in Melbourne, Victoria and began her basketball career as a 15-year-old with the Melbourne Comets.

Selected in the Victorian senior team at the age of 16, Forster was a key element of the state's domination during the Australian Championships from 1960 to 1966 and in 1963 she was awarded the best and fairest for the tournament. That success at state level led to her earning a spot in the national team and in 1962, she travelled with the Opals on a tour of Southeast Asia. Forster was the first player in Australia to regularly deploy a jump shot.

At official FIBA events, Forster played at the 1967 World Championships in Prague, Czechoslovakia where she was captain of the squad. Forster led the scoring for Australia with an average of 21.2 points per game, with a tournament high of 34 against Brazil.

Forster retired in 1970 leaving a substantial mark on the game in Australia. She was instated in the Basketball Victoria Hall of Fame in 1990 prior to her induction in the national Hall of Fame in 2016.
