= Karin McRobert =

Australian basketball player

Personal information
- Born: 11 June 1953 (age 73) Melbourne, Victoria
- Years active: 1975–1985

Sport
- Country: Australia
- Sport: Basketball

Karin Maar-Fields-McRobert (born 11 June 1953) is a former Australian women's basketball player. McRobert represented the Australian women's national basketball team from 1975 to 1985.

== Biography ==
Playing for the national team between 1975 and 1985, McRobert was described as one of the elite players of her generation. Although McRobert did not compete at any Olympic Games, she did however represent Australia at three World Championships; 1975, 1979 and 1983.

In the domestic Women's National Basketball League, McRobert played 150 games for CYMS, Coburg and Bulleen. Her lifetime average of 18 points a game places her in the top 10 all-time list. In 1986, McRobert led the WNBL in points scored with 500 at an average of 20.0 per game. In 2006, McRobert polled as the 9th greatest Australian female basketball player in the 25-year team.

McRobert was inducted into the Australian Basketball Hall of Fame in 2010.

== See also ==
- WNBL Top Shooter Award
- WNBL All-Star Five
