= Damian Keogh =

Australian basketball player

Damian Keogh AM
- Born: 1 February 1962 (age 64); Melbourne, Victoria, Australia
- Occupation: Businessman
- Employer: The HOYTS Group
- Title: Chief executive officer
- Basketball career

Personal information
- Listed height: 194 cm (6 ft 4 in)
- Listed weight: 87 kg (192 lb)

Career information
- Playing career: 1980–1995
- Position: Shooting guard / small forward
- Number: 8

Career history
- 1980–1984: Nunawading Spectres
- 1985: Bankstown Bruins
- 1986–1987: West Sydney Westars
- 1988–1995: Sydney Kings

Career highlights
- All-NBL Second Team (1990); Australian Basketball Hall of Fame (2000); Sydney Kings 25th Anniversary Team (2013)

Damian Thomas Keogh (born 1 February 1962) is an Australian former professional basketball player who played his career in Australia's National Basketball League for the Nunawading Spectres, Bankstown Bruins, West Sydney Westars and Sydney Kings from 1980 to 1995. He also represented the Australian team at the 1984, 1988 and 1992 Summer Olympic Games.

Keogh became the chief executive officer of Val Morgan in 2011, and from 2013 to 2017 was chairman of Sydney-based National Rugby League team the Cronulla-Sutherland Sharks.

On 10 October 2013, Keogh was named in the Sydney Kings' 25th Anniversary Team.

== Early life ==
Damian was born in Melbourne, Victoria and played soccer, basketball and Australian rules football.

== Basketball career ==
Keogh, a 6-foot-4-inch (193 cm) shooting guard or small forward, is regarded as one of Australia's greatest basketballers. His career spanned 16 years and included representing Australia at three Olympic Games (1984, 1988, 1992). Playing 207 games for Australia between 1981 and 1994, Keogh also competed at three world championships (1982, 1990, 1994).

Keogh played 406 games in the NBL and although he was unable to win a championship, he did appear in the NBL Grand Final for Nunawading in 1981 and in the NBL playoffs on eight other occasions.

Following his retirement, he made a transition into the corporate world.

== Post-basketball life ==
Following his retirement from basketball, Keogh became involved in the Sydney Olympic Games bid team and then as a marketing consultant to SOCOG. He was recruited by the Seven Network as the Head of Olympic Marketing in 1997, taking responsibility for the national marketing and promotion associated with the 1998 Nagano Winter Olympic Games and the 2000 Sydney Olympic Games. In 2000, he was promoted to General Manager of Sports Marketing for the Seven Network, overseeing the marketing of the network's entire sports portfolio.

Keogh joined the Multi-Channel Network in 2003 as the Sales & Marketing Director, and in 2011 he was appointed as the CEO of Val Morgan Cinema Network, Australia and New Zealand's leading national supplier of cinema screen advertising. In 2014, Keogh replaced Delfin Fernandez as CEO of The Hoyts Group, which along with owning Val Morgan, operates 43 cinemas across Australia and New Zealand.

He also sits on the boards of Basketball NSW and Basketball Australia. His work has been acknowledged with inclusion into the NBL Hall of Fame and the NSW Sports Hall of Champions.

== Personal life ==
Keogh married former Australian Opals player Maree White in 1986. The couple have four children.

In 2017, he pleaded guilty to possession of cocaine, received an 18-month good behaviour bond, and resigned from the board of the Cronulla Sharks.

== Honour roll ==
NBL career:	1980–1995
NBL Grand Final appearances:	1 (1981)
NBL Championships:	0
NBL Finals appearances:	9 (1980, 1981, 1982, 1983, 1986, 1989, 1990, 1992, 1994)
Sydney Kings 25th Anniversary Team:	2013

== NBL career stats ==
Games:	406 (114 Nun, 26 Ban, 51 WSW, 215 Syd)
Points:	6,795 (16.7 pg)
Rebounds:	3.7 rpg
Assists:	7.0 apg
Steals:	2.7 spg
Blocks:	0.1 bpg
Field goals:	2,033 / 4,828 (42.1%)
3-Pointers:	625 / 1,675 (37.3%)
Free Throws:	854 / 1,138 (75.0%)
