= Ticehurst (surname) =

Ticehurst is an English surname. It is not known whether this surname refers to the village of Ticehurst, England or to a similarly named sub-manor of nearby Burwash which has since fallen into disuse. The surname was used as long ago as 1264, and has been used continuously since at least 1432 by a family living in Ashburnham.

In 1881 the surname was found almost entirely on the south coast of England, with the highest concentration of Ticehursts being located in Sussex but the name has since spread further afield in the UK and also abroad.

Notable people with the surname include:

- Claud Buchanan Ticehurst (1881–1941), British ornithologist
- Ken Ticehurst (born 1945), Australian politician
- Susan Ticehurst, American politician
- Vickie Ticehurst, Australian basketball player
