= Karen Dalton (basketball) =

Australian basketball player

Personal information
- Born: 2 January 1961 (age 65) Sydney, New South Wales
Medal record
Women's Basketball
Representing Australia
FIBA Oceania Championship
Gold medal – first place	1985 Sydney & Newcastle	Team competition
Gold medal – first place	1989 New Zealand	Team competition
Gold medal – first place	1990 Australia & New Zealand	Team competition

Karen Dalton (born 2 January 1961) is a former Australian women's basketball player.

== Biography ==
Dalton played 252 games for the national team between 1983 and 1994. Her tournaments with the Opals include four World Championships - 1983, 1986, 1990 and 1994 - and two Olympic Games; 1984 and 1988.

In the domestic Women's National Basketball League (WNBL), Dalton was a 2-time Defensive Player of the Year (1990 & 1993) and played in 375 games. Following her retirement, Dalton went on to become the head coach of the Sydney Flames, a position she has held since 2001. During the 2001–02 season Dalton was named the WNBL Coach of the Year. In 2004, Dalton was assistant coach to the Australian team that won the silver medal at the Athens Olympics tournament.

Dalton was inducted into the Australian Basketball Hall of Fame in 2007. Dalton is also a Life Member of the WNBL.

== See also ==
- WNBL Defensive Player of the Year Award
