= Misiewicz =

Misiewicz is a Polish surname. Notable people with the surname include:

- Ann Misiewicz, Australian basketball player
- Anthony Misiewicz (born 1994), American baseball player
- Josh Misiewicz (born 1988), American paralympian
- Michał Misiewicz (born 1990), Canadian soccer player
