= Rhonda Hannett =

Australian basketball player

No. 12 – Opals

Personal information
- Born: Illawarra, New South Wales

Rhonda Hannett is a retired Australian women's basketball player.

== Biography ==
Hannett played for the Australia women's national basketball team at the 1971 FIBA World Championship, hosted by Brazil. At that tournament, Hannett led the scoring for Australia with an average of 8.6 points per game.
