= Fran Hammond =

Australian basketball player

No. 6 – Opals
- Position: Guard
- League: Basketball VIC

Personal information
- Born: Traralgon, Victoria, Australia

Career highlights
- Basketball VIC Wall of Fame (2015)

Frances (Fran) Hammond (m. Mason) is a retired Australian women's basketball player.

== Biography ==
Mason played for the Australia women's national basketball team at the 1967 FIBA World Championship for Women, hosted by Brazil. She was selected to represent Australia again at the World Championships in 1971, but withdraw due to family reasons.

Born in Traralgon, Mason was the fifth child of Ellen and Alf Hammond. She attended St Michaels Primary School and secondary education at Kildare College, both in Traralgon.

Mason represented Victoria at the Australian State Championships from 1966 to 1971. For her significant contribution to Victorian basketball, Mason was inducted into their Wall of Fame in 2015.
