= Dianne Cook (basketball) =

Australian basketball player

Personal information
- Born: 30 December 1951 (age 74) Melbourne, Victoria
Medal record
Women's Basketball
Representing Australia

Dianne Cook (née Wilson) (born 30 December 1951) is a former Australian women's basketball player.

== Biography ==
Cook played for the Australia women's national basketball team during the 1970s and 1980 and competed for Australia at the 1975 World Championship held in Colombia and the 1979 World Championship held in South Korea. Cook also played for the Opals at the 1980 World Olympic Qualifying Tournament held in Bulgaria.
