= Cadee =

Cadee is a surname. Notable people with the surname include:

- Jason Cadee (born 1991), Australian basketball player
- Robbie Cadee (born 1950), Australian basketball player and coach
