= Jan Smithwick =

Australian basketball player (born 1952)

Personal information
- Born: 6 August 1952 (age 73); Hamilton, Victoria
- Position: Guard

Career history
- 1981–1982: CYMS Comets
- 1983–1985: Coburg Cougars

Career highlights
- WNBL champion (1985)

Janice (Jan) Smithwick (born 6 August 1952) is an Australian former basketball player and the former captain of the Australia women's national basketball team. In 1985, she won the WNBL championship with the Coburg Cougars.

== Biography ==
Smithwick played for the Australia women's national basketball team during the late 1970s and early 1980s and competed for Australia at the 1979 World Championship held in South Korea. Smithwick also played for the Opals at the 1980 World Olympic Qualifying Tournament held in Bulgaria.

In the domestic Women's National Basketball League (WNBL), Smithwick played for the CYMS Comets (1981–82) and the Coburg Cougars (1983–85).
