= Maree White =

Australian basketball player

Maree Keogh
Personal information
- Born: Maree White; 7 June 1960 (age 66) Darlinghurst, New South Wales

Sport
- Country: Australia
- Sport: Women's Basketball

Maree Keogh (née White, born 7 June 1960) is a former Australian women's basketball player.

== Biography ==
White played for the national team between 1985 and 1990, competing at the 1988 Olympic Games in Seoul. White also represented Australia at the 1986 World Championship held in Moscow.

In the domestic Women's National Basketball League (WNBL) White played 130 games for the Bankstown Bruins. White is married to former Boomer player, Damian Keogh, and have 4 children together.
