= Bronwyn Marshall =

Australian basketball player

Personal information
- Born: 31 December 1963 (age 62) Mackay, Queensland

Sport
- Country: Australia
- Sport: Women's Basketball

Bronwyn Marshall (born 31 December 1963) is a former Australian women's basketball player.

== Biography ==
Marshall played for the national team between 1982 and 1987, competing at the 1984 Olympic Games in Los Angeles. Marshall also represented Australia at two World Championships; 1983 held in Brazil and 1986 held in the Soviet Union.

In the domestic Women's National Basketball League (WNBL) Marshall played 121 games for the Brisbane Blazers. In her post-competitive career, Marshall has worked as the Executive Officer of the Queensland Branch of Sports Medicine Australia, Table Tennis Queensland, and Table Tennis Australia, and as the High Performance Coordinator for Softball Queensland. Marshall is also currently a member of the Basketball Australia High Performance Commission and a member of the Basketball Queensland board.
