= Glenys Bauer =

Australian basketball player

No. 4 – Opals
- Position: Guard
- League: Basketball SA

Personal information
- Born: Adelaide, South Australia, Australia

Career highlights
- Basketball SA 300 Club

Glenys Bauer (née Williams) is a retired Australian women's basketball player.

== Biography ==
Bauer played for the Australia women's national basketball team at the 1971 FIBA World Championship for Women, hosted by Brazil. A long-serving player at club level, Bauer is a member of Basketball SA's 300 Club.
