= Marina Moffa =

Australian basketball player

Personal information
- Born: 17 April 1964 (age 62) Adelaide, South Australia

Sport
- Country: Australia
- Sport: Women's Basketball

Marina Moffa (m. Wood, born 17 April 1964) is a former Australian women's basketball player.

== Biography ==
Moffa played for the national team between 1983 and 1995, competing at two Olympic Games; 1984 and 1988. Moffa also represented Australia at one World Championship, in 1990 and at the 1988 World Olympic Qualifying Tournament for Women.

In the Australian domestic Women's National Basketball League, Moffa played for Adelaide Lightning. Her 296 games with the club over 20 years is the 7th highest number of games played in the league. Moffa's ex-husband is former Boomer player Darryl Pearce.

Moffa is a Life Member of the Women's National Basketball League.
