= Melva Saunders =

Australian basketball player

No. 10 – Opals

Personal information
- Born: 9 May 1931 Mayfield, Newcastle, New South Wales
- Died: 29 May 2021 (aged 90)

Career highlights
- Basketball NSW Hall of Fame (2013)

Melva Claire Saunders (née Hancock, 9 May 1931 – 29 May 2021) was an Australian women's basketball player.

== Biography ==
Hancock played for the Australia women's national basketball team at the 1957 FIBA World Championship for Women, hosted by Brazil. Hancock commenced playing basketball as a junior in 1949 and represented New South Wales (NSW) at the Australian Championships in 1955, 1956, 1960 and 1962. She was a key member of the Newcastle team that won eight straight NSW Country and NSW State championships.

For her participation as a player, manager and administrator of the game from 1949 to 1978, Hancock was inducted into the Basketball NSW Hall of Fame in 2013. Her married name is Melva Hancock.
