= Lorraine Eiler =

Australian basketball player

Personal information
- Born: 9 December 1934 Woodville, Adelaide, South Australia
- Died: 13 December 2021 (aged 87)
Medal record
Women's basketball
Representing Australia

Lorraine Melva Eiler (née MacGuire; 9 December 1934 – 13 December 2021) was an Australian women's basketball player.

== Biography ==
In 1957, at the World Championship for Women held in Brazil, Eiler was captain of the first national team to represent Australia at a World basketball Championship. A talented athlete known for her inspirational leadership, smart play and natural athleticism, Eiler was rewarded after the tournament by being the first ever Australian woman to gain a scholarship to an American University. Eiler was also an A grade tennis player, played squash for South Australia, and represented Australia in netball.

Eiler was inducted into the Australian Basketball Hall of Fame in 2007 and the Sport SA Hall of Fame in 2015.

In March 2025, Basketball South Australia announced that the NBL1 Central's best and fairest women's award would be named the Lorraine Eiler Medal.
