= Ann Misiewicz =

Australian basketball player

Medal record
Women's Basketball
Representing Australia

Ann Misiewicz is a retired Australian women's basketball player.

== Biography ==
Misiewicz played for the Australia women's national basketball team during the 1970s and competed for Australia at the 1975 World Championship held in Colombia.

At 180 cm (5 ft 11 in) tall, Misiewicz played as a Forward. Misiewicz played in an era before the creation of the Women's National Basketball League in 1981. In 1972, Misiewicz won the Halls Medal for the best and fairest player in the South Australian Women's competition.

At the 1975 national (state v state) basketball championships, Misiewicz played for New South Wales. At that tournament, Misiewicz was named to the first All-Star Five team.
