= Patrick Hunt (basketball coach) =

Patrick Hennessy Hunt AM (born 7 March 1953) is a leading Australian basketball coach particularly in the field of player and coach development.

== Coaching career ==
=== Australia ===
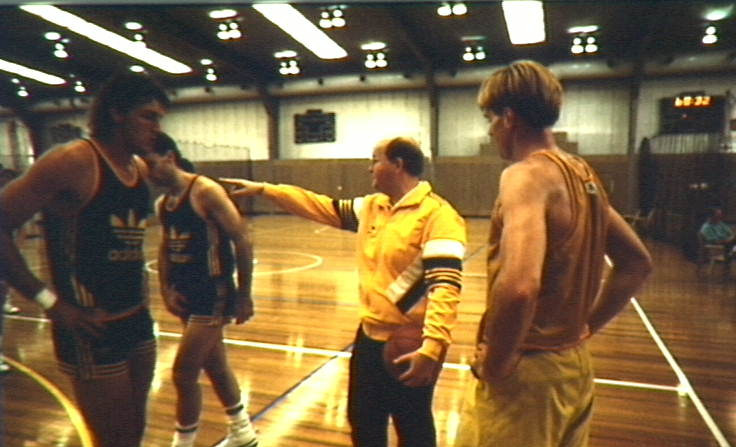
Patrick Hunt coaching at the Australian Institute of Sport in 1988

Hunt commenced his coaching career in the New South Wales regional town Tamworth. Hunt then progressed to coaching New South Wales state teams from 1972. Results for these teams were: gold medal for U20 Men's in 1979 and silver medals for U16 Men in 1972, U16 Men in 1973 and U20 Country Men in 1978. In 1981, he was appointed Head Coach of the National Basketball League team the Canberra Cannons. He held this position until he was appointed Men's Basketball Coach with the Australian Institute of Sport in July 1981, a position he held until 1993. During this period, with Head Coach Adrian Hurley, Hunt coached future Australian Olympic players including Mark Dalton, Luc Longley, Shane Heal, Mark Bradtke, Andrew Vlahov and Brett Maher.

In the early 1980s, Hunt completed a Bachelor of Arts (BA) in Sports Studies from the University of Canberra.

From 1993 to 2008, Hunt was the Manager of National Player and Coach Development for Basketball Australia and Head Coach of the National Intensive Training Centre Program. In this role, Hunt assisted in developing an 'Australian way' of coaching and playing basketball and players to come out of this development included Lauren Jackson, Penny Taylor, Andrew Bogut, Patty Mills and Matthew Dellavedova.

In 2009, he was appointed to the new position of Applied Technical Advancement Coach at the Australian Institute of Sport, working with Olympic Games and World Championship calibre coaches. In 2012, he led an international coach study tour of aspiring Australian Olympic coaches to the 2012 London Olympics. In 2013, he was appointed to the position of Senior Consultant, Australian Institute of Sport, High Performance Coaching and Leadership Section continuing his work with Olympic Games and World Championship coaches and leaders. He held this position until his retirement in August 2017.

Hunt has been an extremely willing contributor to continuing coaches and leaders ongoing development and education at all levels being a guest lecturer at the University of Canberra, guest lecturer in the AIS Masters in Sports medicine program and as a supervisor and mentor in the AIS Phd Scholarship program. He has also presented extensively as a keynote speaker, lecturer and presenter at coaching, sports science and management seminars and conventions within Australia and internationally.

=== International ===
In 2010, Hunt was appointed President of FIBA's World Association of Basketball Coaches. Hunt was engaged by FIBA to scout and identify trends at 2006 and 2010 World Championships and 2016 Rio Olympics. In 2014, he was appointed as Chairman of FIBA's Technical Commission, FIBA's most respected and influential Commission. He continues to hold the FIBA positions with the World Association of Basketball Coaches and Technical Commission.

From 2011, he has been a Program Director with the NBA/FIBA Basketball without Borders Camps Program for Europe, Asia, the America's and Global Camp Program whilst also coaching in the Africa Program.

=== National Team Appointments ===
In 1989, Hunt was appointed Assistant Coach to the Australian men's national basketball team (Boomers) and went to the 1992 Barcelona Olympics, where the team finished sixth. He was member of the Australian scouting team for the Boomers at the 2000 Sydney Olympics, where the team finished fourth.

Hunt was Head Coach at two Junior World Championships - 1987 and 1991 and Assistant Coach at two Junior World Championships - 1979 and 1983.

Hunt was Head Coach of the Australian Men's Basketball teams at the 1983 Summer Universiade and 1985 Summer Universiade.

== Recognition ==
- 1995 - Member of the Order of Australia (AM) for service to basketball, particularly as a coach.
- 2000 - Australian Sports Medal
- 2002 - Life Member of the Australian Basketball Coaches Association
- 2012 - International Lifetime Achievement Award by United States National Association of Basketball Coaches.
- 2016 - Australian Basketball Hall of Fame inductee as a coach
- 2017 - Basketball New South Hall of Fame inductee as a coach
