= Vickie Ticehurst =

Australian basketball player

No. 14 – Opals
- Position: Centre
- League: New South Wales (NSW)

Personal information
- Born: Cowra, New South Wales

Career highlights
- Basketball NSW Hall of Fame (2013)

Vickie Ticehurst (m. Croucher) is a retired Australian women's basketball player.

== Biography ==
Croucher played for the Australia women's national basketball team at the 1967 FIBA World Championship, hosted by Czechoslovakia.

Croucher commenced playing basketball as a junior as a 15-year-old in Nowra, but moved to Sydney in the early 1960s to further her career. She played for New South Wales (NSW) between 1964 and 1968 winning two National titles, gaining selection for the Australian team in 1966 and 1967. For her participation as a player, volunteer and administrator of the game over many years, Croucher was inducted into the Basketball NSW Hall of Fame in 2013.
