= Australia women's national basketball team =

Australia
- FIBA ranking: 5 ▼2 (14 September 2026)
- FIBA zone: FIBA Asia
- National federation: Basketball Australia
- Coach: Sandy Brondello
- Nickname: Opals

Olympic Games
- Appearances: 10
- Medals: (silver) Silver: (2000, 2004, 2008); (bronze) Bronze: (1996, 2012, 2024)

World Cup
- Appearances: 17
- Medals: (gold) Gold: (2006); (silver) Silver: (2018); (bronze) Bronze: (1998, 2002, 2014, 2022)

Asia Cup
- Appearances: 5
- Medals: (gold) Gold: (2025); (silver) Silver: (2017); (bronze) Bronze: (2019, 2021, 2023)

Oceania Championship
- Appearances: 15
- Medals: (gold) Gold: (1974, 1978, 1982, 1985, 1989, 1995, 1997, 2001, 2003, 2005, 2007, 2009, 2011, 2013, 2015)
Home	Away

First international
- Soviet Union 70–32 Australia (Rio de Janeiro, Brazil; 13 October 1957)

Biggest win
- Australia 146–46 India (Traralgon, Australia; 16 March 2006)

Biggest defeat
- Czechoslovakia 74–34 Australia (São Paulo, Brazil; 16 May 1971)
Medal record
Women's basketball
Commonwealth Games
Gold medal – first place	2006 Melbourne	Team
Gold medal – first place	2018 Gold Coast	Team

The Australia women's national basketball team, nicknamed the Opals after the brightly coloured gemstone common to the country, represents Australia in international basketball. From 1994 onwards, the Opals have been consistently competitive and successful having won nine medals at official FIBA international tournaments (Olympics and World Cups), highlighted by a gold medal winning performance at the 2006 World Championship in Brazil. At the now-defunct regional Oceania Championship for Women, the Opals won 15 titles. In 2017, FIBA combined its Oceanian and Asian zones for official senior competitions; following this change, the Opals compete in the FIBA Women's Asia Cup.

== History ==
=== 1950–60s: Beginnings ===
Basketball arrived in Melbourne in 1905, but the first major international women's tournament was the 1953 FIBA World Championships held in Chile. Although the Opals did not qualify for the first tournament, they did, however, qualify for the 1957 Championships held in Brazil. Captained by Lorraine Eiler, the Opals defeated Cuba and Peru. Sixteen year-old Bronte Cockburn led the scoring for Australia with an average of 9.5 points per game, but the inexperienced team ultimately finished in 10th place. Since then, the Opals have helped increase the popularity of the sport in Australia. Australia would not get the opportunity to participate at the 1959 World Championship held in Moscow because at the time, the Australian Government would not allow the team to travel to the USSR. The Opals would not qualify for a World Championship again until the 1967 contest in Czechoslovakia. With an entirely new team and a single victory over Italy, Australia finished in 10th position for the second time. Team captain, Jean Forster, led the scoring for Australia with an average of 21.2 points per game, with a tournament high of 34 against Brazil. Her 21.2 points per game would remain unchallenged for 35 years.

=== 1970s: Early development ===
In 1971, the Opals travelled once again to Brazil. Led by new head coach Merv Harris, and featuring Jill Hammond, the team made several improvements with only three players from the 1967 squad selected. Although the Opals finished in ninth place, they had victories over Madagascar (twice), Argentina, Ecuador and Canada. In 1975, the team headed to Colombia with another new head coach, Jim Madigan. Despite a 74–25 confidence building win over Senegal, as well as victories over Japan, Brazil and Hungary, the team finished in 10th place.

The 1976 Olympics held in Montreal marked the first Olympic medals awarded for women's basketball, but Opals did not qualify for the tournament. Their next major competition would be the 1979 World Championships in South Korea, which would prove to be their first taste of success. The coach again was Jim Madigan, and the squad featured some of the faces of the Opals for the next decade such as Jenny Cheesman, Robyn Maher, Julie Nykiel, Karin Maar and Patricia Mickan. The team would have early success defeating Italy and France, as well as thrashing Malaysia 119–14. Australia would lose their next three games, but bounced back winning their final game over Japan to finish in fourth place, their best international result to that time.

=== 1980s: Into the Olympics ===
In the early days of women's Olympic basketball, only six countries competed in the tournament, and the host country received an automatic entry. Therefore, there were 22 countries competing for the remaining five spots in 1980 Olympics held in Moscow. In the preliminary tournament, the Opals fell to the US and Hungary, and did not qualify for the Olympics. Three years later, the team traveled to Brazil for the 1983 World Championships, looking to demonstrate that their 1979 success was no accident. Despite an early victory over Japan, Australia failed to advance and finished in 11th place. The Opals were not expected to participate at the 1984 Olympic Games held in Los Angeles. However, following the decision by Cuba to boycott the games, the door was opened for the Opals to compete in their first ever Olympics. Led by head coach Brendan Flynn, and team captain Jenny Cheesman, the Opals played competitively in every game, but finished fifth out of the six teams.

The next tournament for the Opals was the 1986 World Championships in Moscow. The first game against Hungary was a two overtime thriller that the Opals lost 79–77. The game set the tone for the tournament, and despite some close finishes against the top rated teams, Australia finished in ninth place. The Opals then headed into the 1988 Seoul Olympics with a medal hope, but they lost the first game to host nation Korea. The Opals bounced back and defeated Bulgaria, meaning that only the powerful Soviet Union stood between them and a semi-finals berth. In a major upset, the Opals defeated the USSR 60–48, setting up a meeting against Yugoslavia. In a memorable game, the Opals lost a closely contested game at the buzzer 57–56, sending them to a rematch with the USSR for the bronze medal. Motivated by the previous loss, the USSR came out determined and outplayed the Opals 68–53. Despite the loss, the fourth-place finish equalled the Opals’ previous best international placing.

=== 1990s: Rise as an International force ===
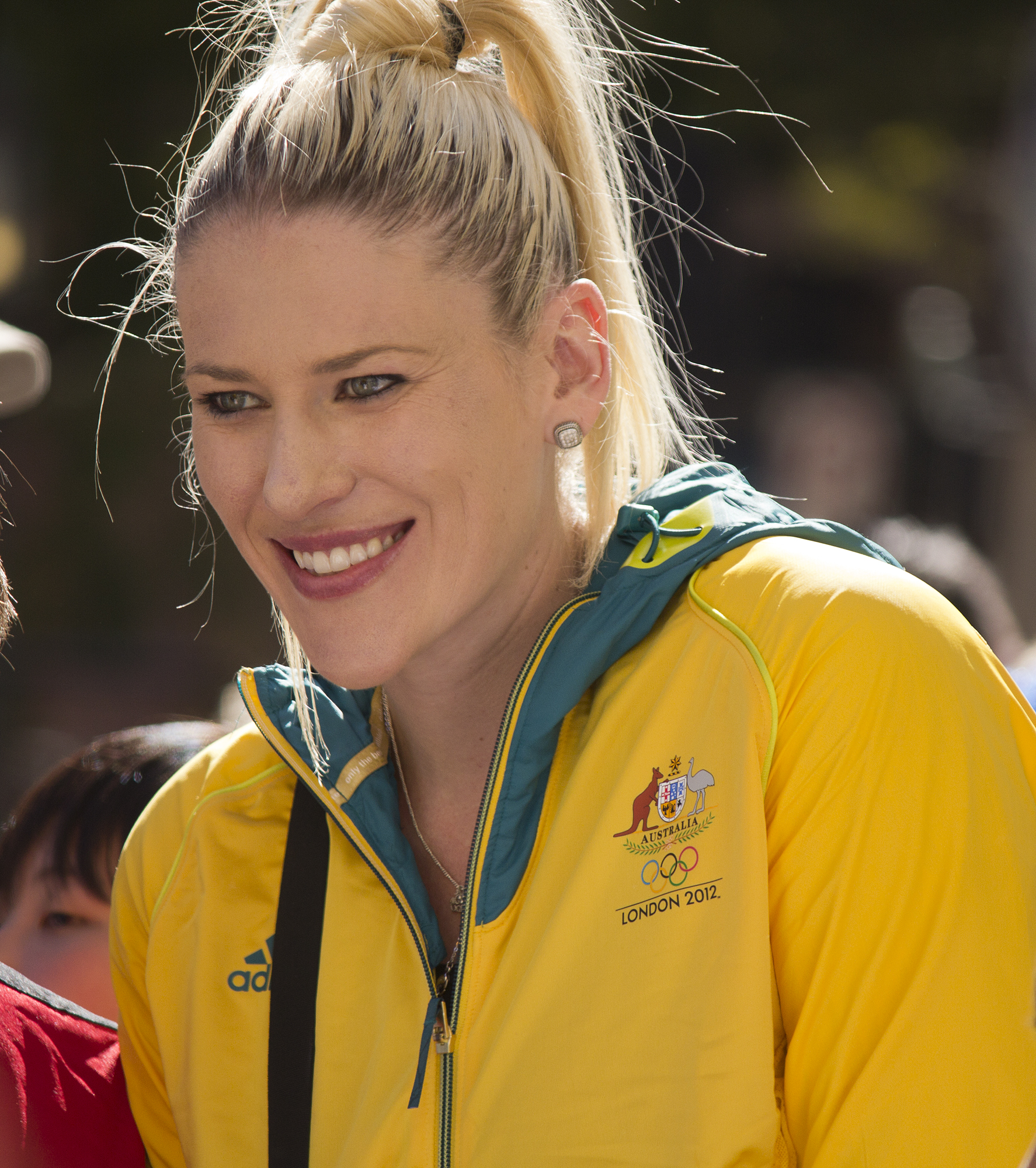
Lauren Jackson in August 2012, Australia's most decorated basketball player

Building from their success at Seoul, the Opals headed to Malaysia for the 1990 World Championships with high hopes. The team won their first two games against Malaysia and Italy, before suffering a string of losses to Bulgaria, the Soviet Union, Yugoslavia and Czechoslovakia. In their final game, the Opals came back from seven-point halftime deficit to beat Bulgaria 73–71 and finish in sixth place. Fifteen teams competed for the five open spots at the 1992 Barcelona Olympics, and despite a respectable 4–2 record at the preliminary tournament, the Opals did not qualify.

Two years later, Australia played host to the 1994 FIBA World Championships. Led by guard Shelley Sandie's 11.9 points per game, the team scored victories over Japan, Italy, Slovakia and Canada to set up a semi-finals match against China. The Opals held an early lead, but China mounted a second half comeback led by Haixia Zheng's 36 points, and Australia just lost by a single point 66–65. In the bronze medal game, Australia played the United States, and despite a small halftime lead, the Opals lost a close game 100–95. The loss however, resulted in a respectable fourth-place finish. The young 1994 team featured the backbone of Australian teams over the next decade; Rachael Sporn, Trisha Fallon, Michelle Brogan, Allison Tranquilli, Sandy Brondello, Annie La Fleur and Jenny Whittle. At the 1994 tournament, the team also adopted the Opals as its nickname.

At the 1996 Summer Olympics held in Atlanta, the Olympic tournament was expanded to twelve teams, making an easier path for Australia to qualify. Captained by Robyn Maher, the Opals started off with strong wins over South Korea, Zaire, and Cuba before losing to eventual gold medalist United States and Ukraine. Australia then persevered through an overtime game against Russia to set up a semi-finals match against the United States. The US won the game 93–71, sending the Opals to a rematch against Ukraine for the bronze medal. Australia held back a second half comeback by Ukraine to win the game 66–56, earning Australia its first ever international basketball medal for either men or women.

In 1998, the Opals looked to build off the bronze medal at the World Championships in Germany. The team featured 17-year-old future star Lauren Jackson, and was led by Michelle Brogan's average of 13.1 points per game. Australia put together a dominant performance, winning their first seven games before losing to Russia 82–76 in a close semi-final match. In the bronze medal game, Carla Boyd's 26 points proved too much for Brazil, and the Opals won 72–67 to earn their second bronze medal in international play.

=== 2000s: A decade of medals and World Champions ===
With Sydney hosting the 2000 Olympic Games, the Opals gained automatic entry into the tournament. Captained by Michele Timms, the team started out with dominating performances winning all of their first seven games, sending them to their first ever gold medal match, against the US. The American team proved too strong for the Opals however, as they won 76–54. Australia won the Silver Medal, their best result in international competition at the time. In 2002, the Opals looked to continue their success in China at the World Championships. Coached by Jan Stirling, captained by Kristi Harrower, and powered by Lauren Jackson's 23.1 points per game (which led the tournament), Australia won its first five games all by double figures. In the second round the Opals lost to Brazil, but bounced back with a 78–52 victory over France in the quarterfinal. In the semi-finals, the Opals lost to eventual gold medalist United States, but recovered the next day to capture the bronze medal with a convincing 91–63 win over South Korea.

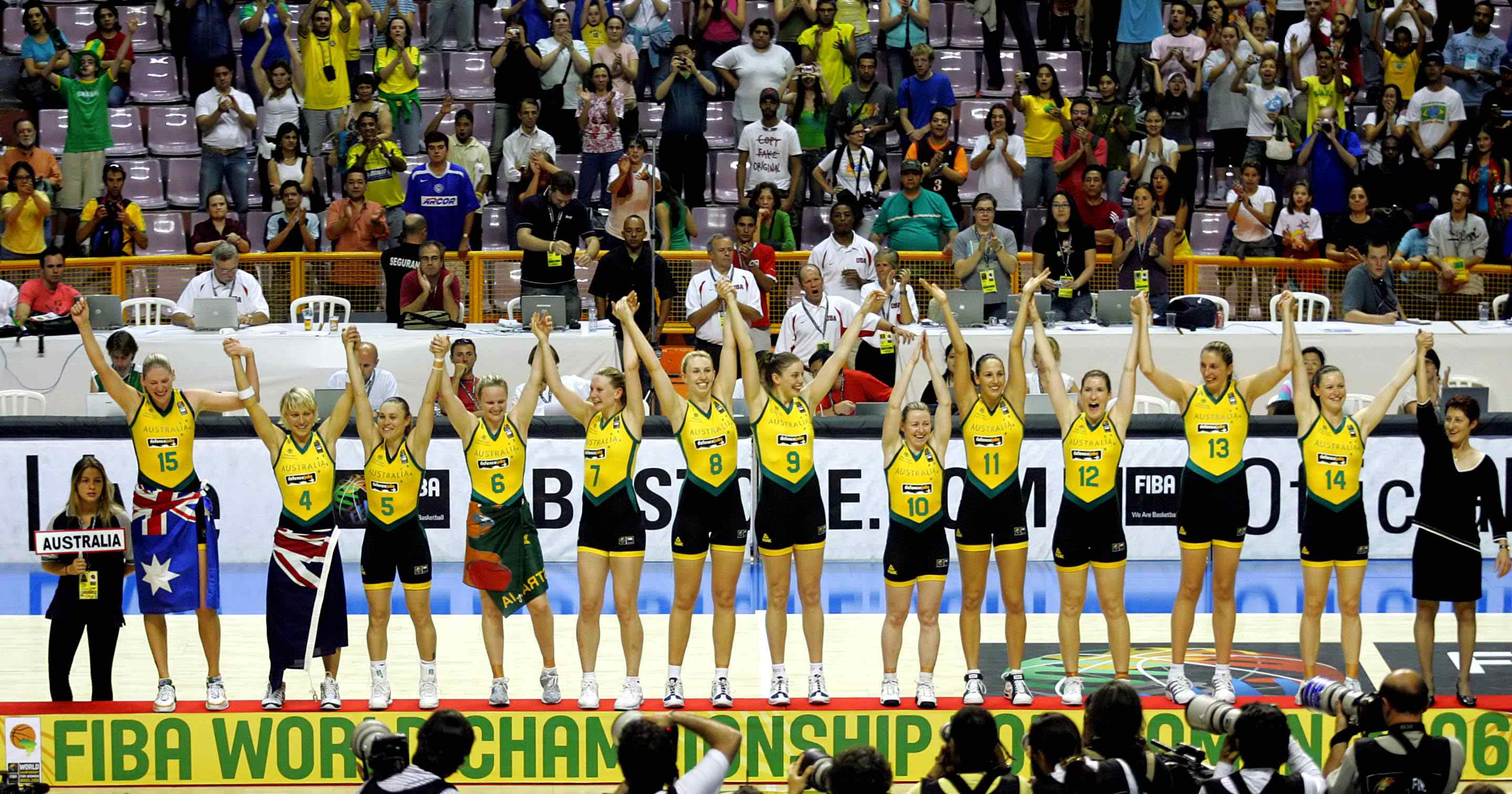
The National team celebrating after being awarded the gold medals for winning the 2006 FIBA World Championship for Women in basketball

At the 2004 Olympics held in Athens, Greece, the Opals were led by Lauren Jackson's tournament best 22.9 points and 10 rebounds per game. With Penny Taylor contributing with 14.8 points per game, Australia dominated early winning their first seven games, all by double digits. The Opals set up a rematch of the 2000 Olympic gold medal match against the US. The United States outlasted the Opals in the fourth quarter to win 74–63, giving the Opals their second straight Olympic silver medal.

The Opals headed to Brazil for the 2006 World Championships looking to win their sixth straight medal in international competitions. Led by Lauren Jackson's 21.3 points per game and Penny Taylor's 18 points per game, first and third best in the tournament respectively, the Opals played their best tournament to date. Australia began the tournament with a forfeit victory over Lithuania. They continued the trend by winning their next seven games decisively, with only one contest being decided by less than 10 points. In the gold medal game against Russia, the Opals led throughout, paced by Penny Taylor's 28 points and Lauren Jackson's 11 rebounds. At the final buzzer, the scoreboard read Australia 91, Russia 74; a convincing victory that delivered Australia's first ever basketball gold medal. Penny Taylor was named the Most Valuable Player of the tournament.

At the 2008 Beijing Olympics, the Opals looked to reaffirm their title as World Champions. In the lead up, Australia went undefeated against Belarus, Brazil, South Korea, Latvia, Russia, Czech Republic and host China to set up a third straight gold medal match against the United States. The Opals had trouble hitting the basket and shot just 24% en route to a 92–65 defeat. The team earned their third straight Olympic silver medal, and their seventh straight international medal finish. The 2000s was a golden era for the Opals, winning at least a bronze medal at every official FIBA tournament.

=== 2010s: Ushering a new era ===
In 2010, the 16th edition of the World Championship was held in the Czech Republic. Pre-tournament favourites Australia, United States, and Russia, dominated play in the first two rounds. In the quarterfinals, however, Australia suffered a shock 79–68 loss to the Czech Republic. The loss meant that the Opals could not finish any higher than 5th place, its worst international result since the early 1990s.

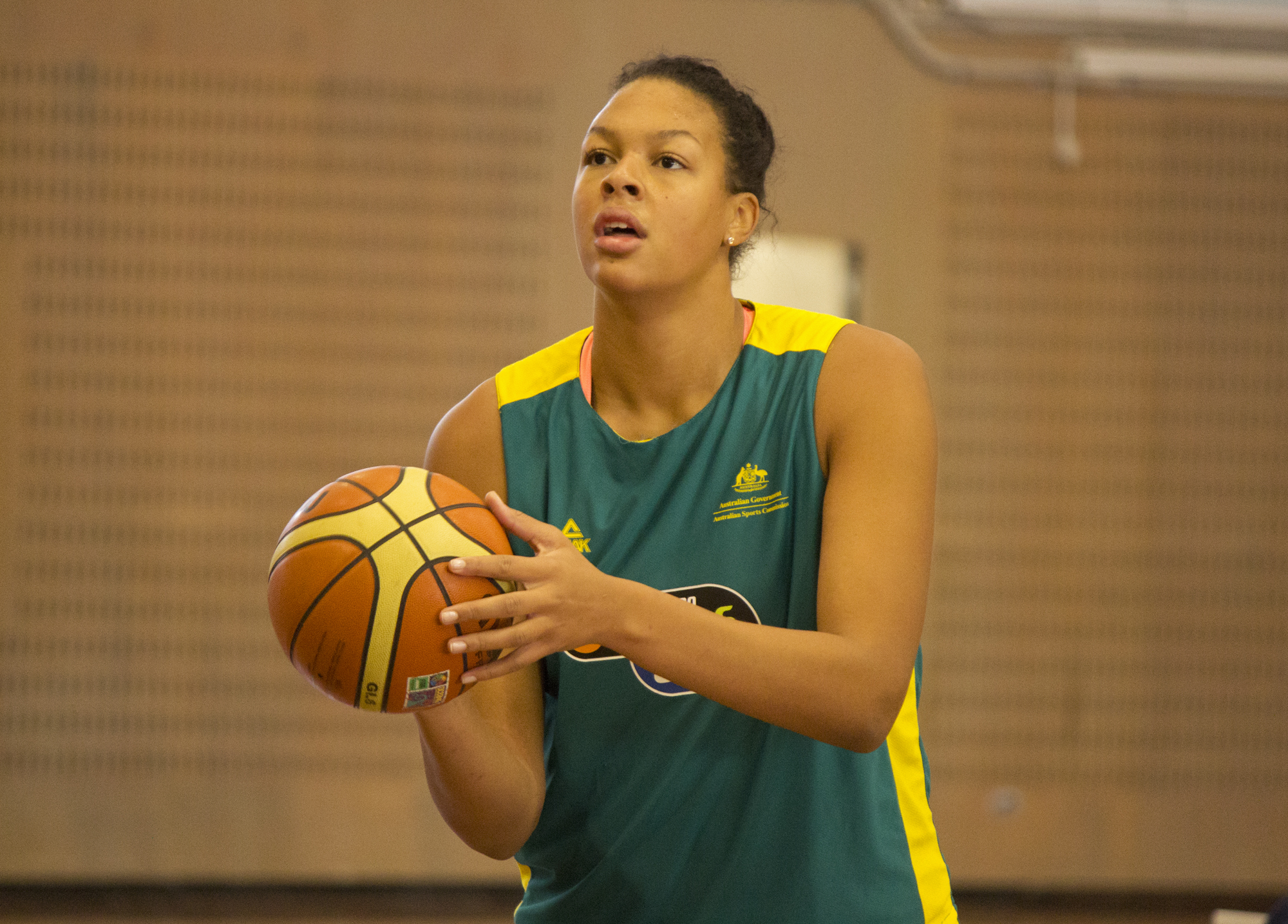
Liz Cambage, the first woman in Olympic history to slam dunk a basketball

Looking to rebound from their disappointing 2010 result, the Opals qualified for the 2012 Olympic Games in London by beating New Zealand three games to nil in the 2011 FIBA Oceania Championship. They finished the Olympic preliminary series with a 4 – 1 record, losing to France in game 2, but after Belinda Snell sank a well behind the half-court line 3-point shot with less than one second on the clock to send the game into overtime. Against Russia, Liz Cambage became the first woman in Olympic history to successfully slam dunk a basketball. In the quarterfinal against China, Lauren Jackson became the Olympic Games record holder for points scored, overtaking Brazilian legend Janeth Arcain's tally of 535 points. The Opals accounted for China 75–60 to set up a semi-final game with their long-time rivals United States. Despite holding a half-time lead, the Opals again fell short losing 86–73. The Opals would however, win their fifth consecutive Olympic medal with an 83–74 win over Russia to claim the bronze.

Leading up to the 2014 World Championship in Turkey, a number of long-serving players announced their retirements or declared themselves unavailable. Those players included Kristi Harrower, Jenni Screen, Kristen Veal, Abby Bishop, Kathleen MacLeod, Samantha Richards, Suzy Batkovic and Jenna O'Hea. Three weeks before the start of the tournament, Lauren Jackson withdrew from the team because of a knee injury. Two weeks later Liz Cambage ruptured her achilles tendon during a pre-tournament game and was ruled-out because of the injury. This resulted in the selection of seven debutants into the squad of 12, a move seen as ushering in a new era of Opals basketball. Despite the loss of veteran players, the Opals went through the preliminary rounds and quarter-final undefeated, setting up a semi-final clash with the US. In a hard-fought game, the Opals cut the lead from 16 points to just six early in the final quarter, before losing 82–70. The Opals would however claim their third bronze medal at world championships with a comfortable 74–44 win against host nation Turkey. Penny Taylor was named to the tournament All-Star Five.

The Opals qualified for the 2016 Olympics in Rio de Janeiro following a series win against New Zealand in August 2015. On 31 March 2016, Lauren Jackson announced her retirement from basketball, citing a chronic knee injury as the reason for her decision. The Olympic squad was announced on 12 July 2016 and included seven Olympic debutants and only three players from the 2012 squad. Notable exclusions included three-time Olympic medallist Suzy Batkovic, reigning WNBL MVP Abby Bishop and Rebecca Allen. Despite slow starts which had plagued Australia throughout the tournament, the Opals finished on top of their group with a 5–0 record, outscoring Japan 33–15 in the final quarter to win by six points. In the Quarter-final, the Opals suffered a shock 73–71 loss to Serbia, conceding 26 turnovers and eliminating them from medal contention. This ended a run of five successive Olympic medals dating back 20 years. One highlight was Liz Cambage breaking Lauren Jackson's Australian Olympic record of points scored in a single game with 37 against Japan. It was the third-highest haul by a woman in Olympic history, and the highest in 28 years.

Following the early exit from the Rio Olympics, Brendan Joyce was replaced in April 2017 by former Opals player and Phoenix Mercury head coach, Sandy Brondello. Unlike previous years, the Opals qualified for the 2018 World Cup through the FIBA Women's Asia Cup held in India where they won a silver medal. Kelsey Griffin was named tournament most valuable player. With basketball returning to the Commonwealth Games for the first time since 2006, the Opals easily accounted for England in the final winning the gold-medal game 99–55. At the 2018 World Cup held in Spain, the Opals led their group with a 3–0 record. They then defeated China 83–42 in the quarter-final and Spain 72–66 in the semi-final to set up a gold-medal final with their long-time rivals United States. The Opals lost the game 73–56 with head coach Sandy Brondello stating a lack of offence proved their downfall. Liz Cambage led the tournament scoring with an average of 23.8 points per game and was named to the All-Star Five.

== Competitive record ==
=== Olympic Games ===
Women's basketball was introduced as an Olympic sport at Montreal in 1976. From 1976 to 1992, only six countries (teams) participated in the Olympic tournament. However, in 1996 at Atlanta the tournament was expanded to twelve teams. Through the 2016 Olympics, Australia qualified for the Olympic Games through competing in the FIBA Oceania Basketball Championship held each four years in the year preceding the games. Typically, this tournament featured either a two or three-game series between Australia and New Zealand. With the Oceania Championship having been discontinued after its 2015 edition, and FIBA having removed all women's continental championships except for EuroBasket Women from the Olympic qualification process in 2017, Australia will qualify for future Olympics through a two-stage process, starting with an Olympic pre-qualifying tournament involving Asian and Oceanian national teams in the year before the Olympics and followed by a worldwide Olympic qualifying tournament held in the year of the Games.

Olympic Games
Year	Round	Position	Pld	W	L	Coach
(Canada) 1976	Did not qualify					
(Soviet Union) 1980	Did not qualify					
(United States) 1984	Preliminary round	5th of 6	5	1	4	Flynn
(South Korea) 1988	Fourth place	4th of 8	5	2	3	Cadee
(Spain) 1992	Did not qualify					
(United States) 1996	Bronze medallists	3rd of 12	8	5	3	Maher
(Australia) 2000	Silver medallists	2nd of 12	8	7	1	Maher
(Greece) 2004	Silver medallists	2nd of 12	8	7	1	Stirling
(China) 2008	Silver medallists	2nd of 12	8	7	1	Stirling
(United Kingdom) 2012	Bronze medallists	3rd of 12	8	6	2	Graf
(Brazil) 2016	Quarter-finals	5th of 12	6	5	1	Joyce
(Japan) 2020	Quarter-finals	8th of 12	4	1	3	Brondello
(France) 2024	Bronze medallists	3rd of 12	6	4	2	Brondello
Total			66	45	21	

=== FIBA Women's World Cup ===
The first official Women's World Cup, known as the Women's World Championship through its 2014 edition, was held in Chile in 1953. The tournament was expanded to 16 countries (teams) in 1990. Since 2017, Australia qualifies for the World Cup through competing in the FIBA Women's Asia Cup, held each four years in the year preceding the Women's World Cup. Before then, Australia qualified through the FIBA Oceania Championship. Typically, this tournament featured either a two or three-game series between Australia and New Zealand. FIBA discontinued the Oceania championships for both women and men after their respective 2015 editions, combining FIBA Asia and FIBA Oceania into a single zone for purposes of World Cup and Olympic qualification.

FIBA Women's World Cup
Year	Round	Position	Pld	W	L	Coach
(Chile) 1953	Did not qualify					
(Brazil) 1957	Classification round	10th of 12	6	2	4	Thomas
(Soviet Union) 1959	Did not qualify					
(Peru) 1964	Did not qualify					
(Czechoslovakia) 1967	Classification round	10th of 11	6	1	5	Gaze
(Brazil) 1971	Classification round	9th of 13	8	5	3	Harris
(Colombia) 1975	Classification round	10th of 13	7	4	3	Madigan
(South Korea) 1979	Fourth place	4th of 12	7	4	3	Madigan
(Brazil) 1983	Classification round	11th of 14	7	3	4	Flynn
(Soviet Union) 1986	Preliminary round	9th of 12	7	3	4	Cadee
(Malaysia) 1990	Quarter-finals	6th of 16	8	3	5	Cadee
(Australia) 1994	Fourth place	4th of 16	8	4	4	Maher
(Germany) 1998	Third place	3rd of 16	9	8	1	Maher
(China) 2002	Third place	3rd of 16	9	7	2	Stirling
(Brazil) 2006	Champions	1st of 16	9	9	0	Stirling
(Czech Republic) 2010	Quarter-finals	5th of 16	9	7	2	Graf
(Turkey) 2014	Third place	3rd of 16	6	5	1	Joyce
(Spain) 2018	Runners-up	2nd of 16	6	5	1	Brondello
(Australia) 2022	Third place	3rd of 12	8	6	2	Brondello
(Germany) 2026	Quarter-finals	6th of 16	5	3	2	Brondello
(Japan) 2030	To be determined					
Total			125	79	46	

=== FIBA Women's Asia Cup ===
Commencing in 2017, teams from Oceania and Asia zones competed together for the first time ever with the top four finishing teams qualifying for the 2018 World Cup.

FIBA Women's Asia Cup
Year	Round	Position	Pld	W	L	Coach
(India) 2017	Runners-up	2nd of 8	6	5	1	Chambers
(India) 2019	Third place	3rd of 8	6	4	2	Brondello
(Jordan) 2021	Third place	3rd of 8	6	4	2	Goriss
(Australia) 2023	Third place	3rd of 8	6	4	2	Seebohm
(China) 2025	Champions	1st of 8	5	5	0	Goriss
(Philippines) 2027	Qualified					
Total			29	22	7	

=== Statistics ===
Australia statistical leaders
Event	PPG	RPG	APG	SPG	BPG
(Brazil) 1957	B. Cockburn (9.5)	–	–	–	–
(Czechoslovakia) 1967	J. Forster (21.2)	–	–	–	–
(Brazil) 1971	R. Hannett (8.6)	–	–	–	–
(Colombia) 1975	M. Jackson (13.3)	–	–	–	–
(South Korea) 1979	M. Jackson (17.7)	–	–	–	–
(Brazil) 1983	R. Maher (11.6)	–	–	–	–
(United States) 1984	J. Nykiel (11.6)	–	–	–	–
(Soviet Union) 1986	K. Foster (10.3)	–	–	–	–
(South Korea) 1988	R. Maher (15.4)	–	–	–	–
(Malaysia) 1990	M. Timms (12.6)	–	–	–	–
(Australia) 1994	S. Sandie (11.9)	R. Sporn (4.6)	R. Maher (3.6)	R. Maher (2.3)	–
(United States) 1996	M. Timms (15.0)	R. Sporn (7.4)	M. Timms (3.5)	M. Timms (2.1)	–
(Germany) 1998	M. Brogan (13.1)	M. Brogan (5.7)	M. Timms (4.0)	K. Harrower (1.7)	–
(Australia) 2000	L. Jackson (15.9)	L. Jackson (8.4)	K. Harrower (3.8)	C. Boyd (1.5)	L. Jackson (2.3)
(China) 2002	L. Jackson (23.1)	M. Brogan (5.6)	K. Harrower (3.1)	P. Taylor (2.4)	L. Jackson (0.5)
(Greece) 2004	L. Jackson (22.9)	L. Jackson (10.0)	K. Harrower (2.8)	P. Taylor (1.6)	L. Jackson (1.6)
(Brazil) 2006	L. Jackson (21.3)	L. Jackson (8.9)	K. Harrower (3.9)	P. Taylor (1.6)	L. Jackson (1.3)
(China) 2008	L. Jackson (17.3)	S. Batkovic (8.9)	K. Harrower (4.4)	P. Taylor (2.1)	L. Jackson (0.7)
(Czech Republic) 2010	E. Cambage (13.6)	L. Jackson (7.9)	K. Harrower (2.6)	K. Harrower (1.6)	E. Cambage (1.0)
(United Kingdom) 2012	L. Jackson (15.9)	L. Jackson (7.9)	J. O'Hea (3.5)	S. Batkovic (1.2)	E. Cambage (1.6)
(Turkey) 2014	M. Tolo (12.2)	M. Tolo (5.2)	P. Taylor (4.8)	E. Phillips (1.6)	C. George (1.0)
(Brazil) 2016	E. Cambage (23.5)	E. Cambage (10.3)	P. Taylor (5.5)	P. Taylor (2.0)	M. Tolo (1.0)
(Spain) 2018	E. Cambage (23.6)	E. Cambage (10.5)	S. Talbot (4.0)	R. Allen (2.1)	E. Cambage (2.8)

== Team ==
=== Current roster ===
Roster for the 2026 FIBA Women's Basketball World Cup.

Australia women's national basketball team roster
Players
Coaches

Pos.	No.	Name	Age – Date of birth	Height	Club	Ctr.
SG	1	Miela Sowah	26 – 4 June 2000	1.75 m (5 ft 9 in)	Golden State Valkyries	(United States)
G	2	Jade Melbourne	24 – 18 August 2002	1.78 m (5 ft 10 in)	Seattle Storm	(United States)
SG	4	Alex Wilson	32 – 21 March 1994	1.83 m (6 ft 0 in)	Sydney Flames	(Australia)
SF	6	Stephanie Talbot	32 – 15 June 1994	1.88 m (6 ft 2 in)	Las Vegas Aces	(United States)
F	11	Alanna Smith	29 – 10 September 1996	1.93 m (6 ft 4 in)	Dallas Wings	(United States)
PG	12	Stephanie Reid	30 – 22 July 1996	1.68 m (5 ft 6 in)	Tasmania Jewels	(Australia)
PF	13	Ezi Magbegor (C)	27 – 13 August 1999	1.93 m (6 ft 4 in)	Seattle Storm	(United States)
G	20	Isobel Borlase	21 – 12 September 2004	1.80 m (5 ft 11 in)	Atlanta Dream	(United States)
C	22	Zitina Aokuso	27 – 23 November 1998	1.93 m (6 ft 4 in)	Adelaide Lightning	(Australia)
F	23	Alex Fowler	25 – 21 July 2001	1.83 m (6 ft 0 in)	Townsville Fire	(Australia)
F	34	Isabelle Bourne	25 – 21 November 2000	1.88 m (6 ft 2 in)	Sydney Flames	(Australia)
PF	55	Chloe Bibby	28 – 15 June 1998	1.88 m (6 ft 2 in)	Minnesota Lynx	(United States)

Head coach

- (Australia) Sandy Brondello

Assistant coach(es)

- (Australia) Renae Garlepp
- (Australia) Paul Goriss
- (New Zealand) Kennedy Kereama

Legend

- (C) Team captain
- Club – describes last
  club before the tournament
- Age – describes age
  on 4 September 2026

=== Past World Cup squads ===
1957 Brazil
(Australia) 1957 Opals squad
Eiler, Lorraine (Captain)
Burke, Nita
Cockburn, Bronte
Flanagan, Gaynor
Hill, Nancy
Hoban, Patricia
Homburg, Eril
Saunders, Melva
Thomas, Vern (Head Coach)

1967 Czechoslovakia
1967 Opals squad
Forster, Jean (Captain)
Bain, Jean
Cooke, Dutchie
Delaney, Terese
Elliott, Elizabeth
Hammond, Fran
Lynch, Rayleen
Reilly, Maureen
Rowe, Pat
Ticehurst, Vickie
Waters, Carole
Wilson, Jean
Gaze, Tony (Head Coach)

1971 Brazil
1971 Opals squad
Rowe, Pat (Captain)
Bain, Jean
Bauer, Glenys
Dhu, Agnes
Franks, Liz
Hammond, Jill
Hannett, Rhonda
Hynes, Rhonda
Tomlinson, Sandra
Verzeletti, Rose
Waters, Carole
Waters, Yvonne
Harris, Merv (Head Coach)

1975 Colombia
1975 Opals squad
Hammond, Jill (Captain)
Bennie, Maree
Blicavs, Ilze
Bowman, Jan
Cheesman, Jenny
Graham (m. Stirling), Jan
Gross, Julie
Harcus, Sue
Maar, Karin
Misiewicz, Ann
Tomlinson, Sandra
Wilson, Dianne
Madigan, Jim (Head Coach)

1979 South Korea
1979 Opals squad
Hammond, Jill (Captain)
Amiet, Sharon
Cheesman, Jenny
Cook (née Wilson), Dianne
Maar, Karin
Gross, Julie
Jackson (née Bennie), Maree
Maher (née Gull), Robyn
Mickan, Patricia
Nykiel, Julie
Smithwick, Jan
Williams, Janet
Madigan, Jim (Head Coach)

1983 Brazil
1983 Opals squad
Cheesman, Jenny (Captain)
Cockrem, Patricia
Dalton, Karen
Deacon, Sharon
Fields, Karin
Foster, Kathy
Laidlaw, Wendy
Maher, Robyn
Marshall, Bronwyn
Mickan, Patricia
Nykiel, Julie
Ogden, Karen
Flynn, Brendan (Head Coach)

1986 Soviet Union
1986 Opals squad
Cheesman, Jenny (Captain)
Brown, Donna
Dalton, Karen
Foster, Kathy
Geh, Sue
Maher, Robyn
Marshall, Bronwyn
Mickan, Patricia
Nykiel, Julie
Rowe, Marisa
Timms, Michele
White, Maree
Cadee, Robbie (Head Coach)

1990 Malaysia
1990 Opals squad
Maher, Robyn (Captain)
Brondello, Sandy
Browning, Tracey
Dalton, Karen
Gorman, Shelley
Hamilton, Lucille
Moffa, Marina
Moyle, Joanne
Reisener, Jenny
Sporn, Rachael
Thornton, Samantha
Timms, Michele
Cadee, Robbie (Head Coach)

1994 Australia
1994 Opals squad
Maher, Robyn (Captain)
Brogan, Michelle
Brondello, Sandy
Dalton, Karen
Fallon, Trish
La Fleur, Annie
Sandie, Shelley
Sporn, Rachael
Thornton, Samantha
Timms, Michele
Tranquilli, Allison
Whittle, Jenny
Maher, Tom (Head Coach)

1998 Germany
1998 Opals squad
Maher, Robyn (Captain)
Boyd, Carla
Brogan, Michelle
Brondello, Sandy
Harrower, Kristi
Hill, Jo
Jackson, Lauren
La Fleur, Annie
Sporn, Rachael
Timms, Michele
Tranquilli, Allison
Whittle, Jenny
Maher, Tom (Head Coach)

2002 China
2002 Opals squad
Harrower, Kristi (Captain)
Batkovic, Suzy
Brogan, Michelle
Brondello, Sandy
Fallon, Trish
Grima, Hollie
Hodges, Laura
Jackson, Lauren
Kingi, Jae
Taylor, Penny
Tranquilli, Allison
Whittle, Jenny
Stirling, Jan (Head Coach)

2006 Brazil
2006 Opals squad
Whittle, Jenny (Captain)
Bevilaqua, Tully
Grima, Hollie
Harrower, Kristi
Hodges, Laura
Jackson, Lauren
McInerny, Emily
Phillips, Erin
Randall, Emma
Screen, Jennifer
Snell, Belinda
Taylor, Penny
Stirling, Jan (Head Coach)

2010 Czech Republic
2010 Opals squad
Jackson, Lauren (Captain)
Bevilaqua, Tully
Bishop, Abby
Cambage, Liz
Grima, Hollie
Harrower, Kristi
O'Hea, Jenna
Phillips, Erin
Richards, Samantha
Snell, Belinda
Taylor, Penny
Tolo, Marianna
Graf, Carrie (Head Coach)

2014 Turkey
2014 Opals squad
Taylor, Penny (Captain)
Allen, Rebecca
Burton, Natalie
Francis, Cayla
Hodges, Laura
Jarry, Rachel
Lavey, Tessa
Mitchell, Leilani
Phillips, Erin
Richards, Gabrielle
Snell, Belinda
Tolo, Marianna
Joyce, Brendan (Head Coach)

2018 Spain
2018 Opals squad
O'Hea, Jenna (Captain)
Allen, Rebecca
Bunton, Alex
Cambage, Liz
Ebzery, Katie-Rae
Francis, Cayla
Lavey, Tessa
Madgen, Tess
Magbegor, Ezi
Smith, Alanna
Talbot, Stephanie
Whitcomb, Sami
Sandy Brondello (Head Coach)

2022 Australia
2022 Opals squad
Allen, Rebecca
Blicavs, Sara
Garbin, Darcee
George, Cayla
Jackson, Lauren
Madgen, Tess (Captain)
Maley, Anneli
Magbegor, Ezi
Talbot, Stephanie
Tolo, Marianna
Wallace, Kristy
Whitcomb, Sami
Sandy Brondello (Head Coach)

=== Past Olympics squads ===
1984 Los Angeles
Games of the XXIII Olympiad
Cheesman, Jenny (Captain)
Cockrem, Patricia
Dalton, Karen
Foster, Kathy
Geh, Sue
Laidlaw, Wendy
Maher, Robyn
Marshall, Bronwyn
Mickan, Patricia
Moffa, Marina
Nykiel, Julie
Quinn, Donna
Flynn, Brendan (Head Coach)

1988 Seoul
Games of the XXIV Olympiad
Cheesman, Jenny (Captain)
Brondello, Sandy
Brown (née Quinn), Donna
Dalton, Karen
Gorman, Shelley
Maher, Robyn
Mickan, Patricia
Moffa, Marina
Nykiel, Julie
Slimmon, Debbie
Timms, Michele
White, Maree
Cadee, Robbie (Head Coach)

1996 Atlanta
Games of the XXVI Olympiad
Maher, Robyn (Captain)
Boyd, Carla
Brogan, Michelle
Brondello, Sandy
Chandler, Michelle
Cook, Allison
Fallon, Trish
Robinson, Fiona
Sandie (née Gormon), Shelley
Sporn, Rachael
Timms, Michele
Whittle, Jenny
Maher, Tom (Head Coach)

2000 Sydney
Games of the XXVII Olympiad
Timms, Michele (Captain)
Boyd, Carla
Brondello, Sandy
Fallon, Trish
Griffiths (née Brogan), Michelle
Harrower, Kristi
Hill, Jo
Jackson, Lauren
La Fleur, Annie
Sandie, Shelley
Sporn, Rachael
Whittle, Jenny
Maher, Tom (Head Coach)

2004 Athens
Games of the XXVIII Olympiad
Fallon, Trish (Captain)
Batkovic, Suzy
Brondello, Sandy
Harrower, Kristi
Jackson, Lauren
Porter, Natalie
Poto, Alicia
Snell, Belinda
Sporn, Rachael
Summerton, Laura
Taylor, Penny
Tranquilli, Allison
Stirling, Jan (Head Coach)

2008 Beijing
Games of the XXIX Olympiad
Jackson, Lauren (Captain)
Batkovic, Suzy
Bevilaqua, Tully
Cox, Rohanee
Grima, Hollie
Harrower, Kristi
Phillips, Erin
Randall, Emma
Screen, Jennifer
Snell, Belinda
Summerton, Laura
Taylor, Penny
Stirling, Jan (Head Coach)

2012 London
Games of the XXX Olympiad
Jackson, Lauren (Captain)
Batkovic, Suzy
Bishop, Abby
Cambage, Liz
Harrower, Kristi
Hodges, Laura
Jarry, Rachel
MacLeod, Kathleen
O'Hea, Jenna
Richards, Samantha
Screen, Jennifer
Snell, Belinda
Graf, Carrie (Head Coach)

2016 Rio de Janeiro
Games of the XXXI Olympiad
Taylor, Penny (Captain)
Burton, Natalie
Cambage, Liz
Ebzery, Katie-Rae
George, Cayla
Hodges, Laura
Jarry, Rachel
Lavey, Tessa
Mitchell, Leilani
Phillips, Erin
Talbot, Stephanie
Tolo, Marianna
Joyce, Brendan (Head Coach)

2020 Tokyo
Games of the XXXII Olympiad
O'Hea, Jenna (Captain)
Allen, Bec
Blicavs, Sara
Ebzery, Katie-Rae
George, Cayla
Lavey, Tessa
Madgen, Tess
Magbegor, Ezi
Mitchell, Leilani
Smith, Alanna
Talbot, Stephanie
Tolo, Marianna
Brondello, Sandy (Head Coach)

2024 Paris
Games of the XXXIII Olympiad
Atwell, Amy
Borlase, Isobel
George, Cayla
Jackson, Lauren
Madgen, Tess (Captain)
Magbegor, Ezi
Melbourne, Jade
Smith, Alanna
Talbot, Stephanie
Tolo, Marianna
Wallace, Kristy
Whitcomb, Sami
Brondello, Sandy (Head Coach)

=== Individual achievements ===
==== Opals all-time games played ====
Rank	Name	Games	Career	World Championships	Olympic Games
1	Robyn Maher*	374	1979–1999	1979, 1983, 1986, 1990, 1994 & 1998	1984, 1988 & 1996
2	Rachael Sporn*	304	1990–2004	1990, 1994 & 1998	1996, 2000 & 2004
3	Sandy Brondello*	302	1988–2004	1990, 1994, 1998 & 2002	1988, 1996, 2000 & 2004
4	Michele Timms*	264	1986–2000	1986, 1990, 1994 & 1998	1988, 1996 & 2000
5	Jenny Whittle*	262	1994–2006	1994, 1998, 2002 & 2006	1996 & 2000
6	Shelley Sandie* (née Gorman)	258	1988–2003	1990 & 1994	1988, 1996 & 2000
7	Karen Dalton*	252	1983–1994	1983, 1986, 1990 & 1994	1984 & 1988
8	Allison Tranquilli (née Cook)	239	1994–2004	1994, 1998 & 2002	1996 & 2004
9	Trisha Fallon*	212	1994–2004	1994 & 2002	1996, 2000 & 2004
10	Kristi Harrower*	209	1998–2012	1998, 2002, 2006 & 2010	2000, 2004, 2008 & 2012
11	Michelle Brogan (m. Griffiths)	180	1994–2003	1994, 1998 & 2002	1996 & 2000
12	Jenny Cheesman*	167	1975–1988	1975, 1979, 1983 & 1986	1984 & 1988
13	Lauren Jackson	150+	1998–2016	1998, 2002, 2006 & 2010	2000, 2004, 2008 & 2012
14	Patricia Mickan	150	1979–1989	1979, 1983 & 1986	1984 & 1988

Legend

- Games played is current as at the completion of the London Olympic Games in August 2012.
- (*) denotes the player is a member of the Australian Basketball Hall of Fame.
- Italic denotes the player is still active.

=== Opals Team Captains ===
Team captain	Period	Tournaments
Lorraine Eiler	1957	1957 World Championship
Jean Forster	1967	1967 World Championship
Pat Rowe	1971	1971 World Championship
Jill Hammond	1975–1979	1975 World Championship; 1979 World Championship
Jenny Cheesman	1980–1988	1980 Pre Olympic Qualification Tournament; 1982 Oceania Championship; 1983 World Championship; 1983 Oceania Championship; 1984 Pre Olympic Qualification Tournament; 1984 Olympic Games; 1985 Oceania Championship; 1986 World Championship; 1987 Oceania Championship; 1988 Olympic Games
Robyn Maher	1990–1998	1990 World Championship; 1992 Pre Olympic Qualification Tournament; 1994 World Championship; 1995 Oceania Championship; 1996 Olympic Games; 1997 Oceania Championship; 1998 World Championship
Michele Timms	1999–2000	1999 Oceania Championship; 2000 Olympic Games
Rachael Sporn	2001	2001 Oceania Championship
Kristi Harrower	2002	2002 World Championship
Trisha Fallon	2003–2004	2003 Oceania Championship; 2004 FIBA Diamond Ball Tournament; 2004 Olympic Games
Jenny Whittle	2005–2006	2005 Oceania Championship; 2006 Commonwealth Games; 2006 World Championship
Natalie Porter	2007	2007 Oceania Championship
Lauren Jackson	2008–2013	2008 FIBA Diamond Ball Tournament; 2008 Olympic Games; 2009 Oceania Championship; 2010 World Championship; 2011 Oceania Championship; 2012 Olympic Games; 2013 Oceania Championship
Penny Taylor	2014, 2016	2014 World Championship; 2016 Olympic Games
Laura Hodges	2015, 2017	2015 Oceania Championship; 2017 Asia Cup
Belinda Snell	2018	2018 Commonwealth Games
Jenna O'Hea	2018–2021	2018 World Cup; 2019 Asia Cup; 2020 Olympic Games
Sami Whitcomb	2021	2021 Asia Cup
Tess Madgen	2022–2024	2022 World Cup; 2023 Asia Cup; 2024 Olympic Games
Cayla George	2025	2025 Asia Cup
Ezi Magbegor	2026	2026 World Cup

Legend

- Tournaments are those officially sanctioned by FIBA.

== See also ==
- Australia men's national basketball team
- Australia women's national 3x3 team
- Australia women's national under-17 basketball team
- Australia women's national under-19 basketball team
- Australia women's national wheelchair basketball team
- Australian Basketball Hall of Fame
- List of Australian WNBA players
- List of Olympic medalists in basketball
