= Patricia Cockrem =

Australian basketball player

Personal information
- Born: 17 May 1961 (age 65) Ayr, Queensland

Sport
- Country: Australia
- Sport: Women's basketball

Patricia "Trish" Cockrem (born 17 May 1961) is a former Australian women's basketball player.

== Biography ==
Cockrem played for the national team between 1981 and 1986, competing at the 1984 Olympic Games in Los Angeles. Cockrem also represented Australia at the 1983 World Championship held in Brazil.

In the domestic Women's National Basketball League (WNBL) Cockrem played 117 games for both the St Kilda Saints and the Brisbane Blazers. Following her international retirement in 1986, Cockrem went on to coach junior developmental squads in Queensland.
