= Inga Freidenfelds =

Australian basketball player (1935–2022)

Personal information
- Nationality: Australian
- Born: 25 April 1935; Riga, Latvia
- Died: 9 April 2022 (aged 86); Adelaide, Australia

Sport
- Sport: Basketball

Inga Freidenfelds (25 April 1935 – 9 April 2022) was an Australian basketball player. He immigrated to Australia as a fifteen year old in 1950, and made his senior debut for South Australia in 1954. Following the 1955 Australian Championships he was selected to the 1956 Olympic Games team as Captain, and averaged 17 points and 10 rebounds per game during the men's basketball tournament. Friedenfelds was inducted as a Player to the Australian Basketball Hall of Fame in 2007.
