= Brendan Flynn =

Brendan Flynn (born 30 December 1953) was an Olympic women's basketball coach and Australian sports administrator.

Flynn was a leading women's basketball coach in South Australia in the late 1970s. He was appointed the Australian women's national basketball team (Opals) Head Coach in 1981, a position which he held until 1984. At the 1984 Los Angeles Olympic Games, he coached the team to fifth position. From 1982 to 1985, he was Women's Head Coach of the Australian Institute of Sport basketball program. He coached the team to third place in the 1983 Women's National Basketball League. After coaching, he transferred to the Australian Institute of Sport's management area.

In 1987, he moved to Adelaide to manage the establishment of the Australian Institute of Sport Cricket Academy, which had its headquarters at the Del Monte Hotel, Henley Beach in Adelaide. As well as cricket, the facility also housed AIS cyclists. In 1998, he was General Manager of Sport at the Australian Paralympic Committee based in Sydney. Following the resignation of Scott Derwin in 1999, he was appointed Chief Executive Officer the Australian Paralympic Committee. He held this position until 2003. His successor was Darren Peters. During this period, he was responsible for managing the Committee in the lead-up to the 2000 Sydney Paralympics. Australia had its best ever Games, finishing first on the medal tally, winning 63 gold, 39 silver and 47 bronze medals. In 2001, there was a controversy about intellectually disabled athletes at the 2000 Games, which resulted in athletes being stripped of their medals. Flynn was one of the Australian Paralympic Committee spokespeople who talked to the media about this issue and its impact on Australian medalists.

He is currently the Chief Operating Officer at Odyssey House in Sydney. His brother Michael is the National Performance Director for Triathlon Australia.
