= Patricia Hoban =

Australian basketball player

No. 8 – Opals
- League: Basketball SA

Personal information
- Born: 16 October 1932 (age 94) Adelaide, South Australia, Australia

Patricia Carol (Pat) Hoban (born 16 October 1932) is a retired Australian women's basketball player.

She played for the Australia women's national basketball team at the 1957 FIBA World Championship for Women, hosted by Brazil.
