= Diane Cook (photographer) =

American photographer

Diane Cook (born 1954) is an American photographer.

Cook has frequently collaborated with her partner Len Jenshel. In 2017 they released the co-authored photo book Wise Trees.

Her work is included in collection of the Museum of Fine Arts Houston, and the Los Angeles County Museum of Art.
