= Australian Basketball Hall of Fame =

- 2007/08 NBL Hall of Fame logo
- Former names: NBL Hall of Fame (1998–2010)
- Established: 1998 (as NBL Hall of Fame)
- Location: Australia
- Type: Sports Hall of Fame
- Collections: Outstanding players, coaches, referees and contributors to Australian Basketball

The Australian Basketball Hall of Fame was instituted by the National Basketball League (NBL) in 1998 as the NBL Hall of Fame as part of their 20th season celebrations. The NBL initiated the Hall of Fame to recognise the outstanding players, coaches, referees and contributors to the league. In 2010, the NBL Hall of Fame united with the Basketball Australia Hall of Fame to create the 'Australian Basketball Hall of Fame'.

To be eligible for induction into the Hall of Fame, NBL candidates must have fulfilled the following criteria:

- Players must have made an outstanding contribution to the NBL, have been retired for a minimum of four seasons, and have played 100 NBL games or more.
- Coaches must have made an outstanding contribution to the NBL, have been retired for at least four seasons, and have been an NBL head coach for 10 seasons or more.
- Referees must have made an outstanding contribution to the league and have been retired for at least four seasons.
- Contributors must have made an outstanding contribution to the NBL, and may be elected at any time.

As of June 2022, the Australian Basketball Hall of Fame has six members with legend status: Alistair Ramsay, Betty Watson, John Raschke, Lindsay Gaze, Michele Timms and Andrew Gaze.

On 1 July 2024, Basketball Australia announced that an entire team, the 2006 Woman's World Cup champions, would be inducted into the Australian Basketball Hall of Fame. It marked the first team to be inducted.

== Inductees ==
†	Indicates those inductees who are now deceased

Year	Name	BA / NBL	Category
1998; 2007	Barry Barnes	NBL; BA	Coach
1998	Cal Bruton	NBL	Player
1998	Herb McEachin	NBL	Player
1998	Bill Palmer	NBL	Contributor
1998; 2004; 2007	John Raschke †	NBL; BA; BA	Contributor; Contributor; Legend
1999	Wayne Carroll	NBL	Player
1999	Al Green	NBL	Player
2000	Damian Keogh	NBL	Player
2000; 2004	Phil Smyth	NBL; BA	Player
2000	Malcolm Speed	NBL	Contributor
2000	Bob Turner	NBL	Coach
2001	Ian Davies †	NBL	Player
2001; 2006	Larry Sengstock	NBL; BA	Player
2002	Danny Morseu	NBL	Player
2002	Darryl Pearce †	NBL	Player
2004	Ivor Burge †	BA	Contributor
2004	Steve Carfino	NBL	Player
2004	Jenny Cheesman	BA	Player
2004; 2022	Andrew Gaze	BA; BA	Player; Legend
2004	Lindsay Gaze	BA; BA	Coach; Legend
2004	Adrian Hurley	BA	Coach
2004	Michael Johnson	NBL	Player
2004	Robyn Maher	BA	Player
2004; 2006	Alistair Ramsay	BA; BA	Contributor; Legend
2004	Sid Taylor	BA	Technical Official
2006	Ray Borner	NBL	Player
2006; 2007	Eddie Crouch	BA; NBL	Technical Official; Referee
2006	George Dancis †	BA	Player
2006	Mark Davis	NBL	Player
2006	John Holden	BA	Technical Official
2006	Maree Jackson	BA	Player
2006	Brian Kerle	NBL	Coach
2006	Leroy Loggins	NBL	Player
2006	Luc Longley	BA	Player
2006	Tom Maher	BA	Coach
2006	Pat Moore	BA	Contributor
2006	George Russell	BA	Contributor
2006	Bob Staunton †	BA	Contributor
2006	Michelle Timms	BA; BA	Player; Legend
2006	Ray Tomlinson	BA	Coach
2006	Betty Watson	BA; BA	Contributor; Legend
2007	Frank Angove †	BA	Contributor
2007	Norma Connolly	BA	Contributor
2007	Kevin Coombs †	BA	Player
2007	Karen Dalton	BA	Player
2007	Lorraine Eiler †	BA	Player
2007	Bob Elphinston	BA	Contributor
2007	Scott Fisher	NBL	Player
2007	Inga Freidenfelds †	BA	Player
2007	Arthur McRobbie †	BA	Contributor
2007	Keith Miller	BA	Coach
2007	Ed Palubinskas	BA	Player
2007	Henry Perazzo †	BA	Technical Official
2007	Avis Scullin	BA	Technical Official
2007	Rachael Sporn	BA	Player
2007	Andrew Vlahov	NBL	Player
2010	Michael Ah Matt †		Player
2010	Sandy Blythe †		Player
2010	Sandy Brondello		Player
2010	David Carmichael		Contributor
2010	Merv Emms †		Contributor
2010	Trisha Fallon		Player
2010	Shelley Gorman-Sandie		Player
2010	Ricky Grace		Player
2010	Elaine Hardwick		Player
2010	Greg Love		Contributor
2010	Karin McRobert		Player
2010	Julie Nykiel		Player
2010	Michael Wrublewski †		Contributor
2010	Bill Wyatt		Player
2012	Ken Cole †		Player; Coach
2013	Mark Bradtke		Player
2013	James Crawford		Player
2013	Kathy Foster		Player
2013	Brian Goorjian		Coach
2013	Neil Hamilton-Smith		Contributor
2013	John Heard		Player
2013	Sue Hobbs		Player
2013	John Martin		Technical Official
2013	Pat Mickan		Player
2013	Charles Ryan †		Contributor
2013	Jan Stirling		Coach
2013	Tom York		Contributor
2016	Perry Crosswhite		Player
2016	Jean Forster		Player
2016	Ron Harvey		Contributor
2016	Patrick Hunt		Coach
2016	Liesl Tesch		Player
2016	Ken Watson †		Coach; Contributor
2016	Jenny Whittle		Player
2017	Lucille Bailie		Player
2017	Karen Blicavs		Player
2017	Carrie Graf		Coach
2017	Kristi Harrower		Player
2017	Ken Madsen		Contributor
2018	Brett Maher		Player
2018	Tony Ronaldson		Player
2018	Glen Saville		Player
2019	Lanard Copeland		Player
2019	Brad Dalton		Player
2019	Ray Hunt		Referee
2019	Lauren Jackson		Player
2019	Lorraine Landon		Contributor
2019	Bill Mildenhall		Referee
2019	Troy Sachs		Player
2019	Allison Tranquilli		Player
2022	Chris Anstey		Player
2022	Michelle Brogan		Player
2022	Peter Harcourt		Contributor
2022	Penny Taylor		Player
2024	Sharon Arnold		Referee
2024	Suzy Batkovic		Player
2024	C. J. Bruton		Player
2024	Matthew Nielsen		Player
2024	Brad Ness		Player
2024	Belinda Snell		Player
