= Robbie Cadee =

Australian basketball player and coach

Personal information
- Born: 27 August 1950 (age 76) Melbourne, Australia
- Listed height: 185 cm (6 ft 1 in)
- Listed weight: 70 kg (154 lb)

Career information
- Playing career: 1979–1983
- Position: Guard

Career history

Playing
- 1979: St. Kilda Saints
- 1980–1983: Bankstown Bruins

Coaching
- 1983: Bankstown Bruins

Career highlights
- As player: NBL champion (1979); As coach: NBL Coach of the Year (1983)

Robert Cadee (born 27 August 1950) is an Australian former professional basketball player and coach.

== Biography ==
Cadee played for the Australia men's national basketball team during the 1970s and competed for Australia at the 1976 Olympic Games held in Montreal. He played in the National Basketball League for the St. Kilda Saints and Bankstown Bruins. Cadee won an NBL championship with the Saints in 1979. He served as a player-coach of the Bruins during the 1983 season and won the NBL Coach of the Year Award.

After his playing career ended, Cadee went on to become a coach, leading the Opals from 1986 to 1992.

Cadee's son, Jason, plays in the National Basketball League (NBL) for the Sydney Kings while his wife Debbie (formerly Debbie Lee) represented the Opals at the 1984 Olympics in Los Angeles. Robbie is uncle to former NBL player and CEO, Grant Cadee.
