= 1967 FIBA World Championship for Women =

1967 edition of the FIBA World Championship for Women

5th FIBA World Championship for Women

Tournament details
- Host country: Czechoslovakia
- Dates: 15–22 April
- Teams: 11 (from 5 confederations)
- Venue: 1 (in 1 host city)

Final positions
- Champions: Soviet Union (3rd title)

Tournament statistics
- MVP: (South Korea) Park Shin-ja
- Top scorer: (Brazil) Nilsa Gurcia (21.7 points per game)

The 1967 FIBA World Championship for Women (Czech: Mistrovství světa FIBA žen v roce 1967) was hosted by Czechoslovakia from 1967. The Soviet Union, a team considered "tall, strong, fast, and highly motivated", won the tournament, defeating South Korea 83-50 in the final. Korean captain Park Shin-ja was selected as the tournament's MVP, becoming the first player from a runner-up squad to ever capture the award.

== Preliminary round ==
=== Group A ===
Team	Pld	W	L	PF	PA	PD	Pts
Soviet Union	3	3	0	229	122	+107	6
Yugoslavia	3	2	1	169	184	−15	5
United States	3	1	2	122	167	−45	4
Australia	3	0	3	133	180	−47	3

15 April

United States	42–38	Australia

Brno, Czechoslovakia

15 April

Soviet Union	83–48	Yugoslavia

Brno, Czechoslovakia

16 April

Australia	58–63	Yugoslavia

Brno, Czechoslovakia

16 April

United States	37–71	Soviet Union

Brno, Czechoslovakia

17 April

Soviet Union	75–37	Australia

Brno, Czechoslovakia

17 April

Yugoslavia	58–43	United States

Brno, Czechoslovakia

=== Group B ===
Team	Pld	W	L	PF	PA	PD	Pts
South Korea	2	2	0	143	122	+21	4
Czechoslovakia	2	1	1	107	106	+1	3
Italy	2	0	2	95	117	−22	2

18 April

South Korea	76–56	Italy

Bratislava, Czechoslovakia

20 April

Czechoslovakia	41–39	Italy

Bratislava, Czechoslovakia

20 April

South Korea	67–66	Czechoslovakia

Bratislava, Czechoslovakia

=== Group C ===
Team	Pld	W	L	PF	PA	PD	Pts
East Germany	3	3	0	161	152	+9	6
Japan	3	2	1	156	146	+10	5
Bulgaria	3	1	2	167	172	−5	4
Brazil	3	0	3	178	192	−14	3

15 April

Brazil	63–67	Japan

Gottwaldov, Czechoslovakia

15 April

Bulgaria	58–62	East Germany

Gottwaldov, Czechoslovakia

16 April

Japan	35–39	East Germany

Gottwaldov, Czechoslovakia

16 April

Brazil	56–65	Bulgaria

Gottwaldov, Czechoslovakia

17 April

Bulgaria	44–54	Japan

Gottwaldov, Czechoslovakia

17 April

East Germany	60–59	Brazil

Gottwaldov, Czechoslovakia

== Classification round ==
Team	Pld	W	L	PF	PA	PD	Pts
Bulgaria	4	4	0	263	179	+84	8
Brazil	4	3	1	246	217	+29	7
Italy	4	1	3	188	224	−36	5
Australia	4	1	3	204	234	−30	5
United States	4	1	3	171	218	−47	5

19 April

Italy	31–63	Bulgaria

Prague, Czechoslovakia

19 April

United States	44–56	Brazil

Prague, Czechoslovakia

20 April

Brazil	60–50	Italy

Prague, Czechoslovakia

20 April

Bulgaria	67–52	Australia

Prague, Czechoslovakia

21 April

United States	45–56	Italy

Prague, Czechoslovakia

21 April

Australia	58–74	Brazil

Prague, Czechoslovakia

22 April

Italy	51–56	Australia

Prague, Czechoslovakia

22 April

Bulgaria	68–40	United States

Prague, Czechoslovakia

== Final round ==
Team	Pld	W	L	PF	PA	PD	Pts
Soviet Union	5	5	0	371	259	+112	10
South Korea	5	4	1	340	339	+1	9
Czechoslovakia	5	3	2	315	263	+52	8
East Germany	5	2	3	277	296	−19	7
Japan	5	1	4	250	309	−59	6
Yugoslavia	5	0	5	269	356	−87	5

19 April

South Korea	64–59	East Germany

Prague, Czechoslovakia

19 April

Yugoslavia	35–69	Czechoslovakia

Prague, Czechoslovakia

19 April

Soviet Union	57–42	Japan

Prague, Czechoslovakia

20 April

East Germany	58–51	Yugoslavia

Prague, Czechoslovakia

20 April

Czechoslovakia	52–62	Soviet Union

Prague, Czechoslovakia

20 April

Japan	60–81	South Korea

Prague, Czechoslovakia

21 April

Yugoslavia	64–68	Japan

Prague, Czechoslovakia

21 April

Czechoslovakia	60–54	East Germany

Prague, Czechoslovakia

21 April

Soviet Union	83–50	South Korea

Prague, Czechoslovakia

22 April

South Korea	78–71	Yugoslavia

Prague, Czechoslovakia

22 April

East Germany	67–86	Soviet Union

Prague, Czechoslovakia

22 April

Japan	45–68	Czechoslovakia

Prague, Czechoslovakia

== Final standings ==
#	Team
1	Soviet Union
2	South Korea
3	Czechoslovakia
4	East Germany
5	Japan
6	Yugoslavia
7	Bulgaria
8	Brazil
9	Italy
10	Australia
11	United States

== Awards ==
1967 World Championship winner

Soviet Union
Third title

All Tournament Team :

(Japan) Asako Yokoyania
(South Korea) Shin-ja Park
(Soviet Union) Skaidrīte Smildziņa-Budovska
(Soviet Union) Feodora Orel
(Soviet Union) Ravilja Prokopenko
