= 1986 FIBA World Championship for Women =

1986 edition of the FIBA World Championship for Women

10th FIBA World Championship for Women
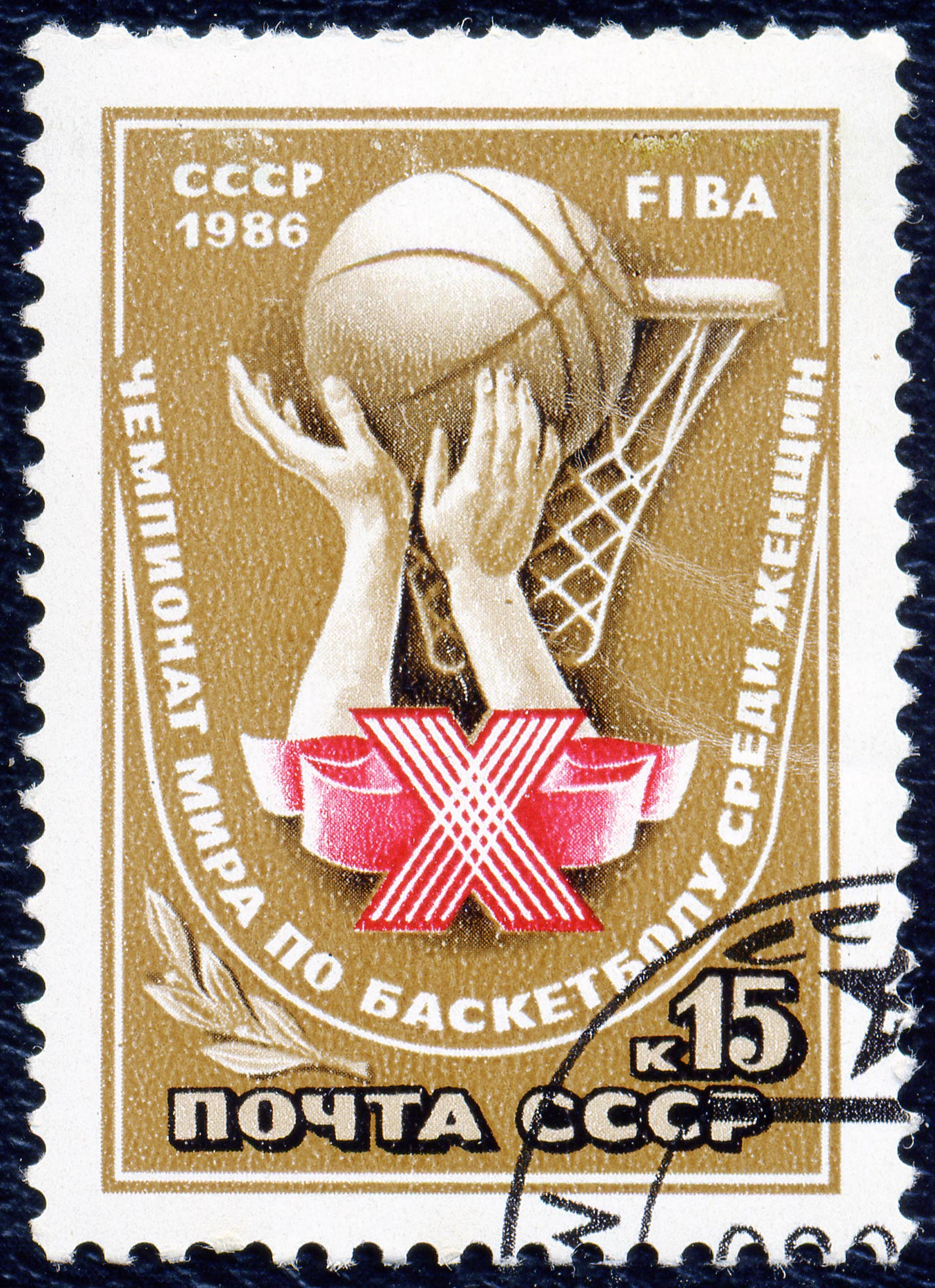
- 1986 USSR stamp.

Tournament details
- Host country: Soviet Union
- Dates: 8–17 August
- Teams: 12 (from 5 federations)
- Venues: 3 (in 3 host cities)

Final positions
- Champions: United States (4th title)

Tournament statistics
- Top scorer: (Cuba) Borrell (26.7)
- PPG (Team): United States (91.0)

Official website
- 1986 FIBA World Championship for Women

The 1986 FIBA World Championship for Women (Russian:1986 Чемпионат мира ФИБА среди женщин) was the tenth FIBA World Championship for Women. The tournament was hosted by the Soviet Union, from 8 to 17 August 1986.

The United States won their fourth world championship, defeating the Soviet Union 108–88 in the final.

== Venues ==
- Olympic Stadium (Moscow)
- Minsk Sports Palace (Minsk)
- Vilnius Palace of Concerts and Sports (Vilnius)

== Preliminary round ==
=== Group A ===
Pos	Team	Pld	W	L	PF	PA	PD	Pts	Qualification
1	Soviet Union	5	5	0	450	360	+90	10	Advance to Final Four Round
2	Canada	5	4	1	343	326	+17	9	Advance to Final Four Round
3	Cuba	5	3	2	397	358	+39	8	Eliminated
4	Bulgaria	5	2	3	361	373	−12	7	Eliminated
5	South Korea	5	1	4	279	371	−92	6	Eliminated
6	Brazil	5	0	5	389	341	+48	5	Eliminated

Updated to match(es) played on unknown. Source: Standings

=== Group B ===
Pos	Team	Pld	W	L	PF	PA	PD	Pts	Qualification
1	United States	5	5	0	447	300	+147	10	Advance to Final Four Round
2	Czechoslovakia	5	4	1	358	334	+24	9	Advance to Final Four Round
3	China	5	3	2	408	344	+64	8	Eliminated
4	Hungary	5	2	3	343	380	−37	7	Eliminated
5	Australia	5	1	4	297	342	−45	6	Eliminated
6	Chinese Taipei	5	0	5	269	422	−153	5	Eliminated

Updated to match(es) played on unknown. Source: Standings

== Final four ==
Semifinals
Canada	59
United States	88
Soviet Union	78
Czechoslovakia	67

Final
United States	108
Soviet Union	88
Third place
Canada	64
Czechoslovakia	59

=== Bronze medal game ===
August 16
19:00

Boxscore

Canada	64–59	Czechoslovakia
Scoring by half: 33-31, 31-28
Pts: Smith 19		Pts: Kotikova 14

=== Final ===
August 17
19:00

Boxscore

United States	108–88	Soviet Union
Scoring by half: 56-43, 52-45
Pts: Miller 23		Pts: Iakovleva 29

== Final standings ==
#	Team
1	United States
2	Soviet Union
3	Canada
4	Czechoslovakia
5	China
6	Cuba
7	Bulgaria
8	Hungary
9	Australia
10	South Korea
11	Brazil
12	Chinese Taipei

== Awards ==
1986 World Championship winner

United States
Fourth title
