= 1979 FIBA World Championship for Women =

1979 edition of the FIBA World Championship for Women

8th FIBA World Championship for Women

Tournament details
- Host country: South Korea
- Dates: 29 April – 13 May
- Teams: 12 (from 5 federations)
- Venue: 1 (in 1 host city)

Final positions
- Champions: United States (3rd title)

Official website
- FIBA World Championship for Women

The 1979 FIBA World Championship for Women (Korean: 1979 FIBA 세계 여자 선수권 대회) was the eighth FIBA World Championship for Women. The tournament was hosted by South Korea, from 29 April to 13 May 1979. The United States won the world championship for the third time.

== Venues ==
City	Venue
Seoul	Jangchung Gymnasium

== Competing nations ==
Group A	Group B	Group C	Final round
Bolivia; Canada; Netherlands; South Korea – host	Brazil; France; Japan; Senegal	Australia; Italy; Malaysia	United States – silver medalists in 1976 Olympics

== Preliminary round ==
Advanced to the final round
Relegated to Classification round for 8–12

=== Group A ===
Team	Pld	W	L	PF	PA	PD	Pts
Canada	3	3	0	244	157	+87	6
South Korea (H)	3	2	1	247	177	+70	5
Netherlands	3	1	2	216	196	+20	4
Bolivia	3	0	3	108	285	−177	3

(H) – host nation.

29 April 1979

Canada	76–63	South Korea
Scoring by half: 34–30, 43–33

Jangchung Gymnasium, Seoul

30 April 1979

Netherlands	95–34	Bolivia
Scoring by half: 50–14, 45–20

Jangchung Gymnasium, Seoul

1 May 1979

Canada	84–36	Bolivia
Scoring by half: 40–18, 44–18

Jangchung Gymnasium, Seoul

1 May 1979

South Korea	78–63	Netherlands
Scoring by half: 42–30, 36–33

Jangchung Gymnasium, Seoul

2 May 1979

Canada	84–58	Netherlands
Scoring by half: 41–30, 43–28

Jangchung Gymnasium, Seoul

2 May 1979

South Korea	106–38	Bolivia
Scoring by half: 60–15, 46–23

Jangchung Gymnasium, Seoul

=== Group B ===
Team	Pld	W	L	PF	PA	PD	Pts	Tie
Japan	3	2	1	203	138	+65	5	1–1, 1.123
France	3	2	1	193	166	+27	5	1–1, 0.966
Brazil	3	2	1	219	188	+31	5	1–1, 0.924
Senegal	3	0	3	127	250	−123	3	

30 April 1979	Brazil	98–57	Senegal	Seoul
	Scoring by half: 49–27, 49–30
				Arena: Jangchung Gymnasium

30 April 1979	France	49–64	Japan	Seoul
	Scoring by half: 24–36, 25–28
				Arena: Jangchung Gymnasium

1 May 1979	Brazil	57–55	Japan	Seoul
	Scoring by half: 25–30, 32–25
				Arena: Jangchung Gymnasium

1 May 1979	Senegal	38–68	France	Seoul
	Scoring by half: 21–32, 17–36
				Arena: Jangchung Gymnasium

2 May 1979	Japan	84–32	Senegal	Seoul
	Scoring by half: 44–13, 40–19
				Arena: Jangchung Gymnasium

2 May 1979	Brazil	64–76	France	Seoul
	Scoring by half: 27–42, 37–34
				Arena: Jangchung Gymnasium

=== Group C ===
Team	Pld	W	L	PF	PA	PD	Pts
Australia	2	2	0	198	90	+108	4
Italy	2	1	1	156	115	+41	3
Malaysia	2	0	2	50	199	−149	2

30 April 1979	Italy	80–36	Malaysia	Seoul
	Scoring by half: 33–18, 47–18
				Arena: Jangchung Gymnasium

1 May 1979	Italy	76–79	Australia	Seoul
	Scoring by half: 35–44, 41–35
				Arena: Jangchung Gymnasium

2 May 1979	Australia	119–14	Malaysia	Seoul
	Scoring by half: 54–10, 65–4
				Arena: Jangchung Gymnasium

== Classification round ==
Pos	Team	Pld	W	L	PF	PA	PD	Pts
8	Netherlands	4	4	0	378	193	+185	8
9	Brazil	4	3	1	373	258	+115	7
10	Bolivia	4	2	2	196	291	−95	6
11	Malaysia	4	1	3	217	333	−116	5
12	Senegal	4	0	4	207	296	−89	4

4 May 1979	Malaysia	62–55	Senegal	Seoul
	Scoring by half: 28–29, 34–26
				Arena: Jangchung Gymnasium

5 May 1979	Bolivia	53–98	Brazil	Seoul
	Scoring by half: 36–68, 17–30
				Arena: Jangchung Gymnasium

6 May 1979	Netherlands	82–44	Senegal	Seoul
	Scoring by half: 44–25, 38–19
				Arena: Jangchung Gymnasium

7 May 1979	Malaysia	66–104	Brazil	Seoul
	Scoring by half: 28–67, 38–37
				Arena: Jangchung Gymnasium

9 May 1979	Bolivia	55–47	Malaysia	Seoul
	Scoring by half: 31–23, 26–24
				Arena: Jangchung Gymnasium

10 May 1979	Brazil	73–82	Netherlands	Seoul
	Scoring by half: 26–46, 47–36
				Arena: Jangchung Gymnasium

11 May 1979	Bolivia	54–51	Senegal	Seoul
	Scoring by half: 27–27, 27–24
				Arena: Jangchung Gymnasium

12 May 1979	Malaysia	42–119	Netherlands	Seoul
	Scoring by half: 24–48, 18–71
				Arena: Jangchung Gymnasium

== Final round ==
The United States qualified outright for the final round of the tournament by the virtue of silver medal finish at the 1976 Olympic Games.

Team	Pld	W	L	PF	PA	PD	Pts	Tie
United States	6	5	1	463	402	+61	11	
South Korea	6	5	1	436	413	+23	11	1–1,0.99
Canada	6	5	1	395	366	+29	11	1–1,0.98
Australia	6	3	3	387	398	−11	9	
Italy	6	2	4	386	376	+10	8	
Japan	6	1	5	350	377	−27	7	
France	6	0	6	338	423	−85	6	

4 May 1979

South Korea	94–82	United States

Seoul

4 May 1979

France	56–59	Australia

Seoul

5 May 1979

Canada	64–55	Italy

Seoul

5 May 1979

Japan	56–64	South Korea

Seoul

6 May 1979

France	59–72	Canada

Seoul

6 May 1979

Italy	64–66	United States

Seoul

7 May 1979

South Korea	76–72	Australia

Seoul

7 May 1979

United States	84–65	Japan

Seoul

9 May 1979

Italy	72–54	France

Seoul

10 May 1979

France	71–76	South Korea

Seoul

10 May 1979

Australia	59–74	United States

Seoul

11 May 1979

Australia	57–66	Canada

Seoul

12 May 1979

Italy	63–50	Japan

Seoul

12 May 1979

United States	80–59	France

Seoul

13 May 1979

Japan	60–61	Australia

Seoul

13 May 1979

South Korea	63–56	Italy

Seoul

13 May 1979

Canada	61–77	United States

Seoul

== Final standings ==
#	Team
1	United States
2	South Korea
3	Canada
4	Australia
5	Italy
6	Japan
7	France
8	Netherlands
9	Brazil
10	Bolivia
11	Malaysia
12	Senegal

== Awards ==
1979 World Championship winner

United States
Third title
