= 1975 FIBA World Championship for Women =

1975 edition of the FIBA World Championship for Women

7th FIBA World Championship for Women

Tournament details
- Host country: Colombia
- Dates: 23 September – 4 October
- Teams: 12 (from 5 federations)
- Venues: 3 (in 3 host cities)

Final positions
- Champions: Soviet Union (5th title)

The 1975 FIBA World Championship for Women (Spanish: 1975 Campeonato Mundial FIBA Femenino) was the seventh FIBA World Championship for Women. The tournament was hosted by Colombia, from 23 September to 4 October 1975. The Soviet Union won the world championship for the fifth time.

== Venues ==
Bogotá	Bucaramanga	Cali
Coliseo Cubierto El Campín	Coliseo Vicente Díaz Romero	Coliseo El Pueblo
Capacity: 10,000	Capacity: 6,000	Capacity: 18,000

== Preliminary round ==
=== Group A ===
Team	Pld	W	L	PF	PA	PD	Pts
Soviet Union	3	3	0	285	146	+139	6
Mexico	3	2	1	161	166	−5	5
Hungary	3	1	2	182	235	−53	4
Canada	3	0	3	160	241	−81	3

23 September

Mexico	59–52	Hungary

Bogotá, Colombia

23 September

Soviet Union	103–52	Canada

Bogotá, Colombia

24 September

Canada	55–67	Hungary

Bogotá, Colombia

24 September

Mexico	31–61	Soviet Union

Bogotá, Colombia

25 September

Canada	53–71	Mexico

Bogotá, Colombia

25 September

Soviet Union	121–63	Hungary

Bogotá, Colombia

=== Group B ===
Team	Pld	W	L	PF	PA	PD	Pts
Italy	3	3	0	207	133	+74	6
South Korea	3	2	1	239	156	+83	5
Brazil	3	1	2	208	208	0	4
Senegal	3	0	3	96	253	−157	3

23 September

South Korea	100–33	Senegal

Cali, Colombia

23 September

Brazil	59–80	Italy

Cali, Colombia

24 September

Brazil	87–48	Senegal

Cali, Colombia

24 September

Italy	61–59	South Korea

Cali, Colombia

25 September

Italy	66–15	Senegal

Cali, Colombia

25 September

Brazil	62–80	South Korea

Cali, Colombia

=== Group C ===
Team	Pld	W	L	PF	PA	PD	Pts
Japan	3	2	1	203	191	+12	5
Czechoslovakia	3	2	1	186	177	+9	5
United States	3	1	2	201	191	+10	4
Australia	3	1	2	156	187	−31	4

23 September

Czechoslovakia	62–42	Australia

Bucaramanga, Colombia

23 September

United States	71–73	Japan

Bucaramanga, Colombia

24 September

United States	65–52	Australia

Bucaramanga, Colombia

24 September

Czechoslovakia	58–70	Japan

Bucaramanga, Colombia

25 September

Japan	60–62	Australia

Bucaramanga, Colombia

25 September

United States	65–66	Czechoslovakia

Bucaramanga, Colombia

== Classification round ==
Team	Pld	W	L	PF	PA	PD	Pts
United States	5	4	1	404	286	+118	9
Hungary	5	3	2	349	280	+69	8
Australia	5	3	2	354	301	+53	8
Canada	5	3	2	361	336	+25	8
Brazil	5	2	3	368	393	−25	7
Senegal	5	0	5	164	404	−240	5

27 September

Australia	74–25	Senegal

Bogotá, Colombia

27 September

Hungary	55–78	United States

Bogotá, Colombia

28 September

Senegal	21–78	Hungary

Bogotá, Colombia

28 September

Brazil	93–83	Canada

Bogotá, Colombia

29 September

Brazil	65–82	Australia

Bogotá, Colombia

29 September

Canada	74–68	United States

Bogotá, Colombia

1 October

United States	89–33	Senegal

Bogotá, Colombia

1 October

Hungary	73–75	Australia

Bogotá, Colombia

2 October

Senegal	37–76	Canada

Bogotá, Colombia

2 October

United States	104–72	Brazil

Bogotá, Colombia

3 October

Australia	71–73	Canada

Bogotá, Colombia

3 October

Hungary	76–51	Brazil

Bogotá, Colombia

== Final round ==
Team	Pld	W	L	PF	PA	PD	Pts
Soviet Union	6	6	0	509	317	+192	12
Japan	6	5	1	461	389	+72	11
Czechoslovakia	6	4	2	379	328	+51	10
Italy	6	3	3	341	365	−24	9
South Korea	6	2	4	433	459	−26	8
Mexico	6	1	5	349	422	−73	7
Colombia	6	0	6	343	535	−192	6

27 September

Colombia	34–92	Soviet Union

Cali, Colombia

27 September

Mexico	76–86	South Korea

Cali, Colombia

28 September

Colombia	63–81	Italy

Cali, Colombia

28 September

Czechoslovakia	50–62	Soviet Union

Cali, Colombia

28 September

Japan	89–62	South Korea

Cali, Colombia

29 September

Japan	80–49	Mexico

Cali, Colombia

29 September

Czechoslovakia	55–45	Italy

Cali, Colombia

1 October

Czechoslovakia	84–44	Colombia

Cali, Colombia

1 October

Soviet Union	103–78	South Korea

Cali, Colombia

2 October

Italy	56–53	Mexico

Cali, Colombia

2 October

South Korea	93–69	Colombia

Cali, Colombia

2 October

Soviet Union	106–75	Japan

Cali, Colombia

3 October

South Korea	55–61	Czechoslovakia

Cali, Colombia

3 October

Italy	49–50	Japan

Cali, Colombia

3 October

Mexico	88–68	Colombia

Cali, Colombia

4 October

Colombia	65–97	Japan

Cali, Colombia

4 October

Italy	49–85	Soviet Union

Cali, Colombia

4 October

Mexico	52–71	Czechoslovakia

Cali, Colombia

== Final standings ==
#	Team
1	Soviet Union
2	Japan
3	Czechoslovakia
4	Italy
5	South Korea
6	Mexico
7	Colombia
8	United States
9	Hungary
10	Australia
11	Canada
12	Brazil
13	Senegal

== Awards ==
1975 World Championship winner

Soviet Union
Fifth title
