= 1971 FIBA World Championship for Women =

1971 edition of the FIBA World Championship for Women

6th FIBA World Championship for Women

Tournament details
- Host country: Brazil
- Dates: 15–29 May
- Teams: 12 (from 5 federations)
- Venues: 4 (in 4 host cities)

Final positions
- Champions: Soviet Union (4th title)

The 1971 FIBA World Championship for Women (Portuguese:Campeonato Mundial Feminino da Fiba de 1971) was the sixth FIBA World Championship for Women. The tournament was hosted by Brazil, from 15 to 29 May 1971. The Soviet Union won the world championship for the fourth time.

== Venues ==
City	Venue
São Paulo	Ginásio do Ibirapuera
Recife	Geraldão Gymnasium
Niterói
Brasília	Nilson Nelson Gymnasium

== Preliminary round ==
=== Group A ===
Team	Pld	W	L	PF	PA	PD	Pts
Czechoslovakia	3	3	0	258	131	+127	6
Japan	3	2	1	256	142	+114	5
Australia	3	1	2	174	206	−32	4
Madagascar	3	0	3	122	331	−209	3

15 May

Czechoslovakia	120–39	Madagascar

Recife, Brazil

15 May

Australia	50–77	Japan

São Paulo, Brazil

16 May

Czechoslovakia	74–34	Australia

São Paulo, Brazil

16 May

Madagascar	28–121	Japan

São Paulo, Brazil

17 May

Madagascar	55–90	Australia

São Paulo, Brazil

17 May

Czechoslovakia	64–58	Japan

São Paulo, Brazil

=== Group B ===
Team	Pld	W	L	PF	PA	PD	Pts
South Korea	3	3	0	243	138	+105	6
France	3	2	1	199	162	+37	5
United States	3	1	2	177	190	−13	4
Ecuador	3	0	3	122	251	−129	3

15 May

United States	50–86	South Korea

Brasília, Brazil

15 May

France	80–49	Ecuador

São Paulo, Brazil

16 May

South Korea	95–37	Ecuador

São Paulo, Brazil

16 May

France	68–51	United States

São Paulo, Brazil

17 May

Ecuador	36–76	United States

São Paulo, Brazil

17 May

South Korea	62–51	France

São Paulo, Brazil

=== Group C ===
Team	Pld	W	L	PF	PA	PD	Pts
Soviet Union	3	3	0	244	103	+141	6
Cuba	3	2	1	160	164	−4	5
Canada	3	1	2	154	206	−52	4
Argentina	3	0	3	107	192	−85	3

15 May

Canada	50–59	Cuba

Niterói, Brazil

15 May

Argentina	16–74	Soviet Union

São Paulo, Brazil

16 May

Cuba	58–38	Argentina

São Paulo, Brazil

16 May

Soviet Union	94–44	Canada

São Paulo, Brazil

17 May

Argentina	53–60	Canada

São Paulo, Brazil

17 May

Soviet Union	76–43	Cuba

São Paulo, Brazil

== Classification round ==
Team	Pld	W	L	PF	PA	PD	Pts
United States	5	5	0	357	280	+77	10
Australia	5	4	1	320	249	+71	9
Canada	5	3	2	353	317	+36	8
Argentina	5	2	3	327	326	+1	7
Ecuador	5	1	4	320	343	−23	6
Madagascar	5	0	5	248	410	−162	5

21 May

Canada	102–52	Madagascar

Araraquara, Brazil

21 May

Australia	72–62	Argentina

Araraquara, Brazil

22 May

United States	70–56	Ecuador

Araraquara, Brazil

22 May

Australia	76–37	Madagascar

Araraquara, Brazil

23 May

Ecuador	69–76	Canada

Araraquara, Brazil

23 May

Madagascar	51–68	Argentina

Araraquara, Brazil

23 May

United States	60–49	Australia

Araraquara, Brazil

24 May

Canada	67–61	Argentina

Araraquara, Brazil

24 May

Ecuador	42–68	Australia

Araraquara, Brazil

24 May

Madagascar	44–73	United States

Araraquara, Brazil

26 May

Australia	55–48	Canada

Araraquara, Brazil

26 May

Argentina	71–74	United States

Araraquara, Brazil

26 May

Ecuador	91–64	Madagascar

Araraquara, Brazil

27 May

Argentina	65–62	Ecuador

Araraquara, Brazil

27 May

Canada	60–80	United States

Araraquara, Brazil

== Final round ==
Team	Pld	W	L	PF	PA	PD	Pts
Soviet Union	6	6	0	521	334	+187	12
Czechoslovakia	6	4	2	418	386	+32	10
Brazil	6	4	2	372	399	−27	10
South Korea	6	3	3	414	412	+2	9
Japan	6	2	4	365	419	−54	8
France	6	1	5	336	410	−74	7
Cuba	6	1	5	349	415	−66	7

19 May

Japan	53–55	Czechoslovakia

São Paulo, Brazil

19 May

Soviet Union	89–67	South Korea

São Paulo, Brazil

20 May

Soviet Union	94–46	Japan

São Paulo, Brazil

20 May

Brazil	55–51	France

São Paulo, Brazil

21 May

Cuba	54–80	Czechoslovakia

São Paulo, Brazil

21 May

France	47–72	South Korea

São Paulo, Brazil

22 May

France	67–68	Japan

São Paulo, Brazil

22 May

Brazil	70–63	South Korea

São Paulo, Brazil

22 May

Cuba	51–88	Soviet Union

São Paulo, Brazil

24 May

Czechoslovakia	69–88	Soviet Union

São Paulo, Brazil

24 May

Brazil	77–76	Japan

São Paulo, Brazil

25 May

Cuba	60–61	France

São Paulo, Brazil

25 May

South Korea	73–63	Japan

São Paulo, Brazil

26 May

Brazil	62–59	Cuba

São Paulo, Brazil

26 May

Czechoslovakia	75–58	France

São Paulo, Brazil

27 May

South Korea	65–72	Cuba

São Paulo, Brazil

27 May

Brazil	59–68	Czechoslovakia

São Paulo, Brazil

28 May

Soviet Union	80–52	France

São Paulo, Brazil

28 May

South Korea	74–71	Czechoslovakia

São Paulo, Brazil

29 May

Japan	59–53	Cuba

São Paulo, Brazil

29 May

Brazil	49–82	Soviet Union

São Paulo, Brazil

== Final standings ==
#	Team
1	Soviet Union
2	Czechoslovakia
3	Brazil
4	South Korea
5	Japan
6	France
7	Cuba
8	United States
9	Australia
10	Canada
11	Argentina
12	Ecuador
13	Madagascar

== Awards ==
1971 World Championship winner

Soviet Union
Fourth title
