= Basketball at the 2008 Summer Olympics – Women's team rosters =

This is a list of the players who are on the rosters of the given teams who are participating in the 2008 Beijing Olympics for Women's Basketball.

== Group A ==
=== Australia ===
The following is the Australia roster in the women's basketball tournament of the 2008 Summer Olympics.

Australia women's national basketball team – 2008 Summer Olympics roster
Players
Coaches

Pos.	No.	Name	Age – Date of birth	Height	Club	Ctr.
G	4	Erin Phillips	23 – July 19, 1985	5 ft 8 in (1.73 m)	Connecticut Sun	(United States)
G	5	Tully Bevilaqua	36 – May 19, 1972	5 ft 5 in (1.65 m)	Indiana Fever	(United States)
G	6	Jennifer Screen	26 – February 19, 1982	5 ft 11 in (1.8 m)	Lavezzini Basket Parma	(Italy)
F	7	Penny Taylor	27 – May 24, 1981	6 ft 0 in (1.83 m)	Phoenix Mercury	(United States)
F/C	8	Suzy Batkovic	27 – May 24, 1981	6 ft 5 in (1.96 m)	UMMC Ekaterinburg	(Russia)
C	9	Hollie Grima	24 – December 16, 1983	6 ft 2 in (1.88 m)	Italmoka Pozzuoli	(Italy)
PG	10	Kristi Harrower	33 – March 4, 1975	5 ft 4 in (1.63 m)	UMMC Ekaterinburg	(Russia)
F	11	Laura Summerton	24 – December 13, 1983	6 ft 2 in (1.88 m)	Levoni Taranto	(Italy)
F	12	Belinda Snell	27 – January 10, 1981	6 ft 0 in (1.83 m)	CJM Bourges Basket	(France)
C	13	Emma Randall	23 – May 6, 1985	6 ft 2 in (1.88 m)	Bulleen Boomers	(Australia)
F	14	Rohanee Cox	28 – April 23, 1980	6 ft 6 in (1.98 m)	Townsville Fire	(Australia)
PF	15	Lauren Jackson (C)	27 – May 11, 1981	6 ft 5 in (1.96 m)	Seattle Storm	(United States)

Head coach

- (Australia) Jan Stirling

Legend

- (C) Team captain
- Club – describes last
  club before the tournament
- Age – describes age
  on August 9, 2008

=== Belarus ===
The following is the Belarus roster in the women's basketball tournament of the 2008 Summer Olympics.

Belarus women's national basketball team – 2008 Summer Olympics roster
Players
Coaches

Pos.	No.	Name	Age – Date of birth	Height	Club	Ctr.
PG	4	Volha Padabed	29 – April 24, 1979	5 ft 9 in (1.75 m)	SK Cesis	(Latvia)
SG	5	Olga Masilionene	28 – January 25, 1980	5 ft 11 in (1.8 m)	Gospic	(Croatia)
G/F	6	Katsiaryna Snytsina	22 – September 2, 1985	6 ft 2 in (1.88 m)	Dynamo-Energiya Novosibirsk	(Russia)
C	7	Viktoryia Hasper	20 – January 9, 1988	6 ft 4 in (1.93 m)	Chevakata Vologda	(Russia)
PG	8	Tatsiana Likhtarovich	20 – March 29, 1988	5 ft 10 in (1.78 m)	Olimpia Grodno	(Belarus)
PG	9	Natallia Anufryienka	23 – June 11, 1985	5 ft 9 in (1.75 m)	Olimpia Grodno	(Belarus)
F/C	10	Anastasiya Verameyenka	21 – July 10, 1987	6 ft 4 in (1.93 m)	Nadezhda Orenburg	(Russia)
C	11	Yelena Leuchanka	25 – April 30, 1983	6 ft 5 in (1.96 m)	UMMC Ekaterinburg	(Russia)
G	12	Natallia Marchanka	29 – May 19, 1979	5 ft 7 in (1.7 m)	Lotos VBW Clima Gdynia	(Poland)
G/F	13	Tatyana Troina	27 – June 30, 1981	6 ft 2 in (1.88 m)	Maccabi Ramat Hen	(Israel)
F	14	Nataliya Trafimava (C)	29 – June 16, 1979	6 ft 1 in (1.85 m)	Wisla Krakow	(Poland)
C	15	Marina Kress	27 – August 23, 1980	6 ft 4 in (1.93 m)	Extragusa	(Spain)

Head coach

- (Belarus) Anatoly Buyalski

Legend

- (C) Team captain
- Club – describes last
  club before the tournament
- Age – describes age
  on August 9, 2008

=== Brazil ===
The following is the Brazil roster in the women's basketball tournament of the 2008 Summer Olympics.

Brazil women's national basketball team – 2008 Summer Olympics roster
Players
Coaches

Pos.	No.	Name	Age – Date of birth	Height	Club	Ctr.
G	4	Adriana Moisés Pinto	30 – June 12, 1978	5 ft 7 in (1.7 m)	ŽKK Gospić	(Croatia)
SG	5	Karla Costa	29 – September 25, 1978	5 ft 8 in (1.73 m)	Catanduva Basket Clube	(Brazil)
G/F	6	Karen Gustavo Rocha	24 – March 4, 1984	5 ft 9 in (1.75 m)	Ourinhos Basquete	(Brazil)
F	7	Micaela Martins Jacintho	29 – June 12, 1979	5 ft 11 in (1.8 m)	Ourinhos Basquete	(Brazil)
G	8	Fernanda Neves Beling	25 – December 5, 1982	6 ft 0 in (1.83 m)	Americana Basketball	(Brazil)
PG	9	Cláudia das Neves (C)	33 – February 17, 1975	5 ft 7 in (1.7 m)	Stade Clermontois BA	(France)
F/C	10	Jucimara Evangelista Dantas	30 – February 4, 1978	6 ft 3 in (1.91 m)	ESB Villeneuve-d'Ascq	(France)
F/C	11	Soeli Garvão Zakrzeski	30 – November 12, 1977	6 ft 2 in (1.88 m)	CDB Zaragoza	(Spain)
F	12	Patrícia Ferreira	29 – March 21, 1979	5 ft 11 in (1.8 m)	Ourinhos Basquete	(Brazil)
C	13	Franciele Nascimento	30 – October 19, 1977	6 ft 3 in (1.91 m)	Rivas Futura	(Spain)
C	14	Graziane de Jesus Coelho	25 – January 18, 1983	6 ft 3 in (1.91 m)	MiZo Pécs 2010	(Hungary)
C	15	Kelly Santos	28 – November 10, 1979	6 ft 4 in (1.93 m)	Seattle Storm	(United States)

Head coach

- (Brazil) Paulo Bassul

Legend

- (C) Team captain
- Club – describes last
  club before the tournament
- Age – describes age
  on August 9, 2008

=== South Korea ===
The following is the South Korea roster in the women's basketball tournament of the 2008 Summer Olympics.

South Korea women's national basketball team – 2008 Summer Olympics roster
Players
Coaches

Pos.	No.	Name	Age – Date of birth	Height	Club	Ctr.
G	4	Kim Yeong-ok	34 – March 4, 1974	5 ft 6 in (1.68 m)	Yongin Samsung Life Bichumi	(South Korea)
G	5	Lee Mi-sun	29 – February 19, 1979	5 ft 9 in (1.75 m)	Yongin Samsung Life Bichumi	(South Korea)
G	6	Choi Youn-ah	22 – October 24, 1985	5 ft 7 in (1.7 m)	Yongin Samsung Life Bichumi	(South Korea)
F	7	Jin Mi-jung	30 – January 28, 1978	5 ft 8 in (1.73 m)	Ansan Shinhan Bank S-Birds	(South Korea)
C	8	Lee Jong-ae	33 – March 18, 1975	6 ft 2 in (1.88 m)	Yongin Samsung Life Bichumi	(South Korea)
C	9	Jung Sun-min (C)	33 – October 12, 1974	6 ft 1 in (1.85 m)	Ansan Shinhan Bank S-Birds	(South Korea)
F	10	Beon Yeon-ha	28 – March 7, 1980	5 ft 11 in (1.8 m)	Yongin Samsung Life Bichumi	(South Korea)
F	11	Park Jung-eun	31 – January 14, 1977	5 ft 11 in (1.8 m)	Yongin Samsung Life Bichumi	(South Korea)
C	12	Ha Eun-joo	24 – September 25, 1983	6 ft 8 in (2.03 m)	Ansan Shinhan Bank S-Birds	(South Korea)
F	13	Kim Jung-eun	20 – September 7, 1987	5 ft 11 in (1.8 m)	Bucheon Shinsegae Coolcat	(South Korea)
C	14	Kim Kwe-ryong	28 – December 17, 1979	6 ft 3 in (1.91 m)	Chuncheon Woori Bank Hansae	(South Korea)
C	15	Sin Jung-ja	27 – December 11, 1980	6 ft 0 in (1.83 m)	Guri Kdb Life Winnus	(South Korea)

Head coach

- (South Korea) Jung Duk-hwa

Legend

- (C) Team captain
- Club – describes last
  club before the tournament
- Age – describes age
  on August 9, 2008

=== Latvia ===
The following is the Latvia roster in the women's basketball tournament of the 2008 Summer Olympics.

Latvia women's national basketball team – 2008 Summer Olympics roster
Players
Coaches

Pos.	No.	Name	Age – Date of birth	Height	Club	Ctr.
PG	4	Elīna Babkina	19 – April 24, 1989	5 ft 8 in (1.73 m)	TTT Rīga	(Latvia)
G	5	Anda Eibele	24 – July 30, 1984	5 ft 7 in (1.7 m)	Avantis/Turība	(Latvia)
PG	6	Zane Eglīte	23 – December 10, 1984	5 ft 7 in (1.7 m)	TTT Rīga	(Latvia)
C	7	Zane Tamane	24 – September 24, 1983	6 ft 5 in (1.96 m)	Hondarribia Irun	(Spain)
SF	8	Gunta Baško	28 – April 27, 1980	5 ft 11 in (1.8 m)	Lattes-Montpellier	(France)
PF	9	Liene Jansone	27 – May 22, 1981	6 ft 4 in (1.93 m)	Gambrinus	(Czech Republic)
SG	10	Anete Jēkabsone-Žogota (C)	24 – August 12, 1983	5 ft 9 in (1.75 m)	Dynamo Moscow	(Russia)
PF	11	Aija Putniņa	20 – January 15, 1988	6 ft 4 in (1.93 m)	Olesa-Espanyol	(Spain)
G/F	12	Dita Krūmberga	24 – March 20, 1984	6 ft 0 in (1.83 m)	SK Cēsis	(Latvia)
SF	13	Ieva Tāre	34 – March 15, 1974	6 ft 1 in (1.85 m)	TTT Rīga	(Latvia)
PF	14	Ieva Kubliņa	26 – July 8, 1982	6 ft 4 in (1.93 m)	Dynamo Moscow	(Russia)
F/C	15	Aija Brumermane	21 – October 17, 1986	6 ft 4 in (1.93 m)	TTT Rīga	(Latvia)

Head coach

- (Latvia) Ainārs Zvirgzdiņš

Assistant coach(es)

- (Latvia) Aigars Nerips

Legend

- (C) Team captain
- Club – describes last
  club before the tournament
- Age – describes age
  on August 9, 2008

=== Russia ===
The following is the Russia roster in the women's basketball tournament of the 2008 Summer Olympics.

Russia women's national basketball team – 2008 Summer Olympics roster
Players
Coaches

Pos.	No.	Name	Age – Date of birth	Height	Club	Ctr.
F/C	4	Marina Kuzina	23 – July 19, 1985	6 ft 5 in (1.96 m)	UMMC Ekaterinburg	(Russia)
PG	5	Oxana Rakhmatulina	31 – December 7, 1976	5 ft 11 in (1.8 m)	UMMC Ekaterinburg	(Russia)
F	6	Natalia Vodopyanova	27 – June 4, 1981	6 ft 3 in (1.91 m)	UMMC Ekaterinburg	(Russia)
PG	7	Becky Hammon	31 – March 11, 1977	5 ft 6 in (1.68 m)	San Antonio Silver Stars	(United States)
SG	8	Marina Karpunina	24 – March 21, 1984	5 ft 9 in (1.75 m)	Spartak Moscow Region	(Russia)
PF	9	Tatiana Shchegoleva	26 – February 9, 1982	6 ft 4 in (1.93 m)	Spartak Moscow Region	(Russia)
SG	10	Ilona Korstin	28 – May 30, 1980	6 ft 0 in (1.83 m)	CSKA Moscow	(Russia)
C	11	Maria Stepanova	29 – February 23, 1979	6 ft 8 in (2.03 m)	CSKA Moscow	(Russia)
C	12	Ekaterina Lisina	20 – October 15, 1987	6 ft 6 in (1.98 m)	CSKA Moscow	(Russia)
F	13	Irina Sokolovskaya (C)	25 – January 3, 1983	6 ft 1 in (1.85 m)	CSKA Moscow	(Russia)
G/F	14	Svetlana Abrosimova	28 – July 9, 1980	6 ft 2 in (1.88 m)	UMMC Ekaterinburg	(Russia)
F/C	15	Irina Osipova	27 – June 25, 1981	6 ft 5 in (1.96 m)	Spartak Moscow Region	(Russia)

Head coach

- (Russia) Igor Grudin

Assistant coach(es)

- (Slovakia) Natália Hejková
- (Russia) Boris Sokolovsky

Legend

- (C) Team captain
- Club – describes last
  club before the tournament
- Age – describes age
  on August 9, 2008

== Group B ==
=== China ===
The following is the China roster in the women's basketball tournament of the 2008 Summer Olympics.

China women's national basketball team – 2008 Summer Olympics roster
Players
Coaches

Pos.	No.	Name	Age – Date of birth	Height	Club	Ctr.
G	4	Song Xiaoyun	25 – December 11, 1982	5 ft 9 in (1.75 m)	WCBA Guangdong	(China)
F	5	Bian Lan	21 – August 16, 1986	6 ft 1 in (1.85 m)	WCBA Jiangsu	(China)
G	6	Zhang Hanlan	29 – July 19, 1979	5 ft 9 in (1.75 m)	WCBA Shenbu	(China)
F	7	Zhang Wei	22 – February 12, 1986	6 ft 0 in (1.83 m)	WCBA Liaoning	(China)
F	8	Miao Lijie (C)	27 – June 3, 1981	5 ft 10 in (1.78 m)	WCBA Heilongjiang	(China)
F	9	Zhang Yu	22 – February 12, 1986	6 ft 0 in (1.83 m)	WCBA Liaoning	(China)
F	10	Sui Feifei	29 – January 29, 1979	6 ft 0 in (1.83 m)	WCBA Bayi	(China)
G	11	Shao Tingting	23 – February 9, 1985	5 ft 9 in (1.75 m)	WCBA Bayi	(China)
C	12	Chen Xiaoli	26 – February 20, 1982	6 ft 4 in (1.93 m)	WCBA Liaoning	(China)
F	13	Liu Dan	21 – April 24, 1987	6 ft 4 in (1.93 m)	WCBA Shenbu	(China)
C	14	Zhang Xiaoni	24 – October 29, 1983	6 ft 4 in (1.93 m)	WCBA Bayi	(China)
C	15	Chen Nan	25 – January 8, 1983	6 ft 5 in (1.96 m)	WCBA Bayi	(China)

Head coach

- (Australia) Tom Maher

Legend

- (C) Team captain
- Club – describes last
  club before the tournament
- Age – describes age
  on August 9, 2008

=== Czech Republic ===
The following is the Czech Republic roster in the women's basketball tournament of the 2008 Summer Olympics.

Czech Republic women's national basketball team – 2008 Summer Olympics roster
Players
Coaches

Pos.	No.	Name	Age – Date of birth	Height	Club	Ctr.
F	4	Jana Veselá	24 – December 31, 1983	6 ft 4 in (1.93 m)	Gambrinus Sika Brno	(Czech Republic)
F/C	5	Ivana Večeřová	29 – March 30, 1979	6 ft 4 in (1.93 m)	Gambrinus Sika Brno	(Czech Republic)
F	6	Romana Hejdová	20 – May 9, 1988	6 ft 0 in (1.83 m)	Valosun Brno	(Czech Republic)
F	7	Michala Hartigová	24 – November 14, 1983	6 ft 4 in (1.93 m)	ZVVZ USK Praha	(Czech Republic)
PG	8	Michaela Uhrová	26 – April 10, 1982	5 ft 4 in (1.63 m)	UMB Banka Bystrica	(Czech Republic)
SG	9	Hana Machová	28 – September 11, 1979	6 ft 0 in (1.83 m)	Gambrinus Sika Brno	(Czech Republic)
C	10	Edita Šujanová	23 – May 23, 1985	6 ft 3 in (1.91 m)	Bonas UFK Nitra	(Czech Republic)
F/C	11	Miloslava Svobodová	22 – September 16, 1985	6 ft 3 in (1.91 m)	Gambrinus Sika Brno	(Czech Republic)
F	12	Markéta Mokrošová (C)	27 – April 17, 1981	5 ft 10 in (1.78 m)	ZVVZ USK Praha	(Czech Republic)
C	13	Petra Kulichová	23 – September 13, 1984	6 ft 6 in (1.98 m)	Gambrinus Sika Brno	(Czech Republic)
SG	14	Kateřina Elhotová	18 – October 14, 1989	5 ft 11 in (1.8 m)	ZVVZ USK Praha	(Czech Republic)
F	15	Eva Vítečková	26 – January 26, 1982	6 ft 3 in (1.91 m)	Gambrinus Sika Brno	(Czech Republic)

Head coach

- (Czech Republic) Jan Bobrovsky

Legend

- (C) Team captain
- Club – describes last
  club before the tournament
- Age – describes age
  on August 9, 2008

=== Mali ===
The following is the Mali roster in the women's basketball tournament of the 2008 Summer Olympics.

Mali women's national basketball team – 2008 Summer Olympics roster
Players
Coaches

Pos.	No.	Name	Age – Date of birth	Height	Club	Ctr.
G	4	Kadiatou Toure	25 – January 18, 1983	5 ft 9 in (1.75 m)	Djoliba AC	(Mali)
F	5	Nassira Traore	19 – October 28, 1988	6 ft 1 in (1.85 m)	Djoliba AC	(Mali)
G	6	Mariatou Diarra	22 – November 20, 1985	5 ft 10 in (1.78 m)	Dakar Université Club	(Senegal)
G	7	Fatoumata Bagayoko	20 – May 23, 1988	5 ft 10 in (1.78 m)	Djoliba AC	(Mali)
F	8	Diana Gandega	25 – June 2, 1983	5 ft 7 in (1.7 m)	Strasbourg IG	(France)
G/F	9	Hamchétou Maïga (C)	30 – April 25, 1978	6 ft 1 in (1.85 m)	Gambrinus SIKA Brno	(Czech Republic)
F	10	Kadiatou Kanoute	30 – June 11, 1978	5 ft 10 in (1.78 m)	Powerbasket Tigers Wels	(Austria)
F/C	11	Diéné Diawara	23 – January 29, 1985	6 ft 4 in (1.93 m)	Limoges ABC	(France)
F/C	12	Naîgnouma Coulibaly	19 – May 31, 1989	6 ft 4 in (1.93 m)	Basket Landes	(France)
C	13	Meiya Tirera	22 – April 15, 1986	5 ft 11 in (1.8 m)	Djoliba AC	(Mali)
C	14	Aminata Sininta	22 – December 23, 1985	6 ft 1 in (1.85 m)	Djoliba AC	(Mali)
C	15	Djenebou Sissoko	26 – June 27, 1982	6 ft 2 in (1.88 m)	Djoliba AC	(Mali)

Head coach

- (France) José Ruiz

Legend

- (C) Team captain
- Club – describes last
  club before the tournament
- Age – describes age
  on August 9, 2008

=== New Zealand ===
The following is the New Zealand roster in the women's basketball tournament of the 2008 Summer Olympics.

New Zealand women's national basketball team – 2008 Summer Olympics roster
Players
Coaches

Pos.	No.	Name	Age – Date of birth	Height	Club	Ctr.
F	4	Charmian Purcell	29 – January 7, 1979	5 ft 11 in (1.8 m)	Christchurch Sirens	(New Zealand)
G	5	Noni Wharemate	26 – January 17, 1982	5 ft 7 in (1.7 m)	Christchurch Sirens	(New Zealand)
G	6	Angela Marino	22 – February 3, 1986	5 ft 5 in (1.65 m)	Adelaide Lightning	(Australia)
G	7	Micaela Cocks	22 – May 2, 1986	5 ft 8 in (1.73 m)	Oregon Ducks	(United States)
F	8	Natalie Taylor	25 – December 24, 1982	6 ft 0 in (1.83 m)	Christchurch Sirens	(New Zealand)
G	9	Suzie Bates	20 – September 16, 1987	5 ft 8 in (1.73 m)	Christchurch Sirens	(New Zealand)
F	10	Lisa Wallbutton	22 – January 14, 1986	6 ft 0 in (1.83 m)	Christchurch Sirens	(New Zealand)
G	11	Kate McMeeken-Ruscoe	28 – November 19, 1979	5 ft 8 in (1.73 m)	Christchurch Sirens	(New Zealand)
C	12	Jessica McCormack	18 – September 8, 1989	6 ft 4 in (1.93 m)	Connecticut Huskies	(United States)
G	13	Clare Bodensteiner	23 – October 11, 1984	5 ft 9 in (1.75 m)	Stanford Cardinal	(United States)
F	14	Jillian Harmon	21 – March 3, 1987	6 ft 1 in (1.85 m)	Stanford Cardinal	(United States)
F	15	Aneka Kerr (C)	27 – March 1, 1981	6 ft 0 in (1.83 m)	Christchurch Sirens	(New Zealand)

Head coach

- (Australia) Mike McHugh

Assistant coach(es)

- (Australia) Leigh Gooding

Legend

- (C) Team captain
- Club – describes last
  club before the tournament
- Age – describes age
  on August 9, 2008

=== Spain ===
The following is the Spain roster in the women's basketball tournament of the 2008 Summer Olympics.

Spain women's national basketball team – 2008 Summer Olympics roster
Players
Coaches

Pos.	No.	Name	Age – Date of birth	Height	Club	Ctr.
PF	4	Laura Nicholls	19 – February 26, 1989	6 ft 2 in (1.88 m)	Celta Vigourban	(Spain)
C	5	Cindy Lima	27 – June 21, 1981	6 ft 4 in (1.93 m)	CB San José	(Spain)
PF	6	Tamara Abalde	19 – February 6, 1989	6 ft 4 in (1.93 m)	Lamar Cardinals	(United States)
SG	7	Isabel Sánchez	20 – September 16, 1987	5 ft 10 in (1.78 m)	Perfumerias Avenida Salamanca	(Spain)
C	8	Lucila Pascua	25 – March 21, 1983	6 ft 5 in (1.96 m)	CB San José	(Spain)
SG	9	Laia Palau	28 – September 10, 1979	5 ft 9 in (1.75 m)	Ros Casares Valencia	(Spain)
PG	10	Elisa Aguilar	31 – October 15, 1976	5 ft 8 in (1.73 m)	Ros Casares Valencia	(Spain)
G	11	Nuria Martínez	24 – February 29, 1984	5 ft 9 in (1.75 m)	Dynamo Moscow	(Russia)
PF	12	Anna Montañana	27 – October 24, 1980	6 ft 1 in (1.85 m)	Perfumerias Avenida Salamanca	(Spain)
SF	13	Amaya Valdemoro (C)	31 – August 18, 1976	6 ft 0 in (1.83 m)	CSKA Samara	(Russia)
SF	14	María Revuelto	26 – January 27, 1982	6 ft 0 in (1.83 m)	CB San José	(Spain)
SG	15	Alba Torrens	18 – August 30, 1989	6 ft 3 in (1.91 m)	Celta Vigourban	(Spain)

Head coach

- (Spain) Evaristo Pérez

Assistant coach(es)

- (Spain) Víctor Lapeña
- (Spain) Susana García

Legend

- (C) Team captain
- Club – describes last
  club before the tournament
- Age – describes age
  on August 9, 2008

=== United States ===
The following is the United States roster in the women's basketball tournament of the 2008 Summer Olympics.

United States women's national basketball team – 2008 Summer Olympics roster
Players
Coaches

Pos.	No.	Name	Age – Date of birth	Height	Club	Ctr.
F	5	Seimone Augustus	24 – April 30, 1984	6 ft 1 in (1.85 m)	Minnesota Lynx	(United States)
G	6	Sue Bird	27 – October 16, 1980	5 ft 9 in (1.75 m)	Seattle Storm	(United States)
F	10	Tamika Catchings	29 – July 21, 1979	6 ft 0 in (1.83 m)	Indiana Fever	(United States)
C	13	Sylvia Fowles	23 – June 10, 1985	6 ft 6 in (1.98 m)	Chicago Sky	(United States)
G	7	Kara Lawson	27 – February 14, 1981	5 ft 8 in (1.73 m)	Sacramento Monarchs	(United States)
C	9	Lisa Leslie	36 – July 7, 1972	6 ft 5 in (1.96 m)	Los Angeles Sparks	(United States)
F	8	DeLisha Milton-Jones	33 – September 11, 1974	6 ft 1 in (1.85 m)	Los Angeles Sparks	(United States)
G/F	15	Candace Parker	22 – April 19, 1986	6 ft 4 in (1.93 m)	Los Angeles Sparks	(United States)
G	4	Cappie Pondexter	25 – January 7, 1983	5 ft 9 in (1.75 m)	Phoenix Mercury	(United States)
G	14	Katie Smith	34 – June 4, 1974	5 ft 11 in (1.8 m)	Detroit Shock	(United States)
G/F	12	Diana Taurasi	26 – June 11, 1982	6 ft 0 in (1.83 m)	Phoenix Mercury	(United States)
F	11	Tina Thompson	33 – February 10, 1975	6 ft 2 in (1.88 m)	Houston Comets	(United States)

Head coach

- (United States) Anne Donovan

Assistant coach(es)

- (United States) Gail Goestenkors
- (United States) Dawn Staley
- (United States) Mike Thibault

Legend

- (C) Team captain
- Club – describes last
  club before the tournament
- Age – describes age
  on August 9, 2008

== See also ==
- Wheelchair basketball at the 2008 Summer Paralympics – Rosters
