= FIBA Oceania Women's Championship =

Women's basketball continental championship of Oceania

- Sport: Basketball
- Founded: 1974
- First season: 1974
- Folded: 2015
- Replaced by: FIBA Women's Asia Cup
- No. of teams: 2
- Country: FIBA Oceania member nations
- Continent: FIBA Oceania (Oceania)
- Last champion: Australia (15th title)
- Most titles: Australia (15 titles)
- Website: www.FIBAOceania.com

The FIBA Oceania Women's Championship was the women's basketball continental championship of Oceania, played biennially under the auspices of the Fédération Internationale de Basketball, the basketball sport governing body, and the Oceanian zone thereof. The tournament also serves to qualify teams for participation in the quadrennial FIBA World Championship for Women and the Olympic basketball tournament.

Beginning in 2017, all FIBA continental championships for women will be held on a two-year cycle, and the continental championships will be part of the qualifying process for either the World Cup or Olympics. The 2015 Oceanian Championships were the last Oceanian Championships to ever be held as starting 2017, the tournament will merge with the FIBA Asia Championship to give way for the FIBA Asia-Pacific Championship

== Summaries ==
Results highlighted in blue were Olympic qualifiers, those which are not were World Championship qualifiers.

As host nation for the 2000 Olympic Games in Sydney, Australia automatically qualified for the Olympics, and did not compete in 1999. New Zealand were scheduled to play American Samoa, but American Samoa withdrew, meaning the 1999 tournament was scratched and New Zealand were awarded the championship, becoming the FIBA Oceania qualifier for the 2000 Sydney Olympics.

Year	Host	Qualification series					Bronze medallists
Year	Host	Gold	Game 1	Game 2	Game 3	Silver	Bronze medallists
1974; Details	Australia	Australia	69–42	72–44	75–55	New Zealand	Only two teams competed
1978; Details	New Zealand	Australia	68–37	63–33	89–32	New Zealand	Only two teams competed
1982; Details	Australia	Australia	66–46	64–32	85–55	New Zealand	Only two teams competed
1985; Details	Australia	Australia	63–36	62–43	N/A	New Zealand	Only two teams competed
1989; Details	New Zealand	Australia	93–45	107–59	80–38	New Zealand	Only two teams competed
1993; Details	New Zealand	New Zealand	120–56	106–61	120–58	Western Samoa	Only two teams competed
1995; Details	Australia	Australia	89–44	79–45	N/A	New Zealand	Only two teams competed
1997; Details	New Zealand	Australia	99–61	One game playoff for the championship		New Zealand	New Caledonia
2001; Details	New Zealand	Australia	97–61	102–55	N/A	New Zealand	Only two teams competed
2003; Details	Australia	Australia	69–55	84–61	N/A	New Zealand	Only two teams competed
2005; Details	New Zealand	Australia	77–51	75–67	67–38	New Zealand	Only two teams competed
2007; Details	New Zealand	Australia	87–46	One game playoff for the championship		New Zealand	Fiji
2009; Details	Australia	Australia	98–48	97–57	Two-legged tie	New Zealand	Only two teams competed
2011; Details	Australia	Australia	77–64	92–73	82–57	New Zealand	Only two teams competed
2013; Details	New Zealand	Australia	66–50	84–66	Two-legged tie	New Zealand	Only two teams competed
2015; Details	Australia	Australia	61–41	80–63	Two-legged tie	New Zealand	Only two teams competed

=== Medal table ===
Rank	Nation	Gold	Silver	Bronze	Total
1	Australia	15	0	0	15
2	New Zealand	1	15	0	16
3	Samoa	0	1	0	1
4	Fiji	0	0	1	1
4	New Caledonia	0	0	1	1
Totals (5 entries)		16	16	2	34

== Participating nations ==
Nation	(Australia) 1974	(New Zealand) 1978	(Australia) 1982	(Australia) 1985	(New Zealand) 1989	(New Zealand) 1993	(Australia) 1995	(New Zealand) 1997	(New Zealand) 2001	(Australia) 2003	(New Zealand) 2005	(New Zealand) 2007	(Australia) 2009	(Australia) 2011	(New Zealand) 2013	(Australia) 2015	Years
Australia	1st	1st	1st	1st	1st		1st	1st	1st	1st	1st	1st	1st	1st	1st	1st	15
Fiji												3rd					1
New Caledonia								3rd									1
New Zealand	2nd	2nd	2nd	2nd	2nd	1st	2nd	2nd	2nd	2nd	2nd	2nd	2nd	2nd	2nd	2nd	16
Samoa						2nd											1
Total	2	2	2	2	2	2	2	3	2	2	2	3	2	2	2	2	
