= List of international WNBL players =

The following is a list of international players in the Australian Women's National Basketball League (WNBL).

The list includes players both past and present. This list includes players from Australia who represent other nations internationally, as well as international players who have Australian permanent residency.

== By country ==
Note: This list is correct as of 1 March 2026.

Pos	G	Guard	F	Forward	C	Center
Yrs	Number of seasons played in the WNBL					
	Denotes player who has received a WNBL Award					
*	Denotes player who is currently active in 2025–26					

Nationality	Player	Pos.	Career span	Yrs	Birthplace
Belgium	Julie Vanloo	G	2019 – 2020	1	Belgium
Canada	Kayla Alexander	C	2018 – 2019	1	Canada
Canada	Laeticia Amihere	F	2024 – 2025	1	Canada
Canada	Chelsea Aubry	F	2009 – 2015	6	Canada
Canada	Claudia Brassard	F	2000 – 2007	6	Malaysia
Canada	Cassandra Brown	F	2023 – 2024	1	Canada
Canada	Bridget Carleton	G	2019 – 2020	1	Canada
Canada	Ruth Davis	C	2016 – 2024	3	Canada
Canada	Leanne Evans	C	2010 – 2011	1	Canada
Canada	Kalisha Keane	F	2016 – 2017	1	Canada
Canada	Kia Nurse	G	2018 – 2020	2	Canada
Canada	Krista Phillips	C	2011 – 2013	2	Canada
Canada	Emily Potter	C	2023 – 2024	1	Canada
Canada	Nayo Raincock-Ekunwe	F	2016 – 2017	1	Canada
Canada	Tamara Tatham	F	2015 – 2016	1	Canada
Canada	Emily Wetzel	G	1995	1	Canada
China	Han Xu	C	*2025 – 2026	1	China
China	Lin Liu	F	1994	1	China
China	Qiu Chen	G	1988 – 1989	2	China
Chinese Taipei	Bao Hsi-le	C	2015 – 2016	1	Chinese Taipei
France	Olivia Époupa	G	*2019 – 2025	2	France
France	Kadi Sissoko	F	*2025 – 2026	1	France
France	Isabelle Strunc	G	2013 – 2014	1	France
Germany	Elke Lindner	C	1997	1	Germany
Germany	Sophie Von Saldern	F	1996 – 1997	2	Germany
Ireland	Caroline Burgess	G/F	2009 – 2011	2	Australia
Israel	Daniel Raber	F	2024 – 2025	1	Israel
Italy	Nicole Romeo	G	2009 – 2014	5	Australia
Japan	Monica Okoye	F	2023 – 2024	1	Japan
Lithuania	Augustina Žygaitė	C	2010 – 2011	1	Soviet Union
New Zealand	Suzie Bates	G	2007 – 2010	2	New Zealand
New Zealand	Stella Beck	G	2018 – 2020	3	New Zealand
New Zealand	Jessica Bygate	F	2015 – 2017	2	New Zealand
New Zealand	Micaela Cocks	G	2011 – 2022	10	New Zealand
New Zealand	Rebecca Cotton	F	2003 – 2004	1	New Zealand
New Zealand	McKenna Dale	G	2023 – 2024	1	United States
New Zealand	Penina Davidson	F	2018 – 2024	6	New Zealand
New Zealand	Antonia Farnworth	G	2007 – 2020	13	New Zealand
New Zealand	Mary Goulding	G	2020 – 2022	2	New Zealand
New Zealand	Tegan Graham	G	*2025 – 2026	1	United States
New Zealand	Lauryn Hippolite	G	2022	2	New Zealand
New Zealand	Jillian Harmon	G	2014 – 2015	1	United States
New Zealand	Jordan Hunter	G	2016 – 2017	1	New Zealand
New Zealand	Ashleigh Karaitiana	G	2010 – 2020	4	New Zealand
New Zealand	Aneka Kerr	F	1999 – 2010	11	New Zealand
New Zealand	Krystal Leger-Walker	G	2022 – 2023	1	New Zealand
New Zealand	Casey Lockwood	C	2009 – 2011	2	United States
New Zealand	Angela Marino	G	2005 – 2015	10	New Zealand
New Zealand	Jessica McCormack	C	2009 – 2011	2	New Zealand
New Zealand	Esra McGoldrick	F	2023 – 2024	1	New Zealand
New Zealand	Kate McMeeken-Ruscoe	G	2006 – 2012	5	New Zealand
New Zealand	Julie Ofsoski	F	1998 – 2004	2	New Zealand
New Zealand	Chevannah Paalvast	G	2015 – 2020	4	New Zealand
New Zealand	Lisa Pardon	G	2007 – 2010	1	New Zealand
New Zealand	Kalani Purcell	F	2017 – 2022	5	New Zealand
New Zealand	Tera Reed	F	*2023 – 2026	3	New Zealand
New Zealand	Sharne Robati	F	*2025 – 2026	1	New Zealand
New Zealand	Emme Shearer	G	*2026	1	New Zealand
New Zealand	Ashlee Strawbridge	F	*2025 – 2026	1	New Zealand
New Zealand	Ashley Taia	G	2018 – 2020	2	Australia
New Zealand	Ritorya Tamilo	C	2024	1	New Zealand
New Zealand	Natalie Taylor	F	2007 – 2014	6	New Zealand
New Zealand	Ella Tofaeono	F/C	*2023 – 2026	3	Australia
New Zealand	Lisa Wallbutton	F	2007 – 2014	5	New Zealand
New Zealand	Nonila Wharemate	G	2007 – 2008	1	New Zealand
New Zealand	Charlotte Whittaker	F	*2025 – 2026	1	New Zealand
New Zealand	Kim Wielens	G	1994 – 2002	8	New Zealand
New Zealand	Donna Wilkins	F	2004 – 2008	4	New Zealand
Nigeria	Chinyere Ibekwe	F/C	2010	1	United States
Nigeria	Ify Ibekwe	F	2015 – 2016	1	United States
Poland	Marta Dydek	C	2009 – 2010	1	Poland
Portugal	Diana da Costa Neves	G	2010 – 2011	1	South Africa
Puerto Rico	Jazmon Gwathmey	G	2016 – 2017	1	United States
Russia	Elena Minaeva	C	1994 – 1995	2	Soviet Union
Serbia	Roksana Boreli	C	1988	1	Yugoslavia
Spain	Julia Goureeva	F	1994 – 1996	3	Spain
Spain	Laia Palau	G	2017 – 2018	1	Spain
South Sudan	Nyaduoth Lok	G	*2024 – 2026	2	Australia
Sweden	Amanda Zahui B.	C	2023 – 2024	1	Sweden
Ukraine	Diana Sadovnikova	C	1993 – 1995	3	Soviet Union
United Kingdom	Nicole How	G	2014 – 2016	2	Malaysia
United Kingdom	Johannah Leedham	G	2011 – 2012	1	United Kingdom
United Kingdom	Megan Moody	G	2009 – 2010	1	Australia
United Kingdom	Emma Pass	C	2008 – 2009	1	United Kingdom
United Kingdom	Karlie Samuelson	G	2022 – 2023	1	United States
United Kingdom	Natalie Stafford	G	2010 – 2012	2	Australia
United Kingdom	Azania Stewart	C	2013 – 2014	1	United Kingdom
United States	Jessica Adair	C	2012 – 2013	1	United States
United States	Janelle Adams	G	2016 – 2017	1	United States
United States	Lindsay Allen	G	2018 – 2022	3	United States
United States	Rachel Allison	F	2010 – 2011	1	United States
United States	Ashley Arlen	F	2025	1	United States
United States	Ariel Atkins	G	2019 – 2020	1	United States
United States	Rachel Banham	G	2017 – 2018	1	United States
United States	Lasondra Barrett	F	2013 – 2014	1	United States
United States	Mistie Bass	F	2017 – 2018	1	United States
United States	Alana Beard	G	2005	1	United States
United States	Kierstan Bell	G	2022	1	United States
United States	Jennifer Benningfield	F	2008 – 2009	1	United States
United States	Monique Billings	F	2021 – 2022	1	United States
United States	Chante Black	C	2016 – 2017	1	United States
United States	Debbie Black	G	1989 – 1996	8	United States
United States	Maria Blazejewski	F	2022	1	United States
United States	Erin Bollmann	F	2025	1	United States
United States	Sarah Boothe	F/C	2018 – 2019	1	United States
United States	Rae Burrell	G/F	2022 – 2023	1	United States
United States	Veronica Burton	G	2024 – 2025	1	United States
United States	Paige Bradley	G	2023 – 2024	1	United States
United States	Brianna Butler	G	2016 – 2017	1	United States
United States	Danielle Campbell	C	2009 – 2010	1	United States
United States	Jordin Canada	G	2023 – 2024	1	United States
United States	Natasha Cloud	G	2016 – 2017	1	United States
United States	Nia Coffey	F	2018 – 2025	2	United States
United States	Dekeiya Cohen	G	2022	1	United States
United States	Charli Collier	C	2024 – 2025	1	United States
United States	Zia Cooke	G	2024	1	United States
United States	Rhonda Corkeron	F	1992 – 2001	1	United States
United States	Lauren Cox	F	*2024 – 2025	2	United States
United States	Jennifer Crouse	C	2002 – 2009	5	United States
United States	Sophie Cunningham	G	2019 – 2020	1	United States
United States	Brittany Davis	F	2008 – 2009	1	United States
United States	Rennia Davis	F	2022	1	United States
United States	Regina Days	F	1992 – 1997	4	United States
United States	Japreece Dean	G	2024 – 2025	1	United States
United States	Amy Denson	F	2010 – 2012	2	United States
United States	Jasmine Dickey	G	2023 – 2024	1	United States
United States	Blake Dietrick	G	2016 – 2017	1	United States
United States	Shanavia Dowdell	F	2011 – 2012	2	United States
United States	Amanda Dowe	F	2017	1	United States
United States	Courtney Duever	F	2017	1	United States
United States	Chelsea Dungee	G	2021	1	United States
United States	Sania Feagin	F/C	*2025 – 2026	1	United States
United States	Kim Foley	F	1990 – 1993	4	United States
United States	Kristin Folkl	F	1999 – 2000	1	United States
United States	Tracy Gahan	F	2006 – 2011	4	United States
United States	Ashley Gayle	F	2013	1	United States
United States	Martè Grays	F	2019 – 2020	1	United States
United States	Tanya Haave	F	1997	1	United States
United States	Jennifer Hamson	C	2016 – 2018	2	United States
United States	Cassie Harberts	F	2014 – 2015	1	United States
United States	Tianna Hawkins	F	2022 – 2023	1	United States
United States	Amber Hegge	F	2013 – 2014	1	United States
United States	Naz Hillmon	F	2023 – 2025	2	United States
United States	Jordan Hooper	F	2015 – 2018	2	United States
United States	Mackenzie Holmes	F	*2025 – 2026	1	United States
United States	Amanda Johnson	F	2018 – 2019	1	United States
United States	Paris Johnson	C	2014 – 2015	1	United States
United States	Haley Jones	G	2024 – 2025	1	United States
United States	Amy Kame	G	2016 – 2017	1	United States
United States	Lynetta Kizer	F/C	2024	1	United States
United States	Laurie Koehn	G	2012 – 2015	3	United States
United States	Mehryn Kraker	F	2023 – 2024	1	United States
United States	Jessica Kuster	F	2019 – 2020	1	United States
United States	Betnijah Laney	F	2015 – 2019	3	United States
United States	Crystal Langhorne	F/C	2019	1	United States
United States	Kisha Lee	F	2016 – 2017	1	United States
United States	D'Lesha Lloyd	G	2012	1	United States
United States	Samantha Logic	G	2016 – 2017	1	United States
United States	Marina Mabrey	G	2022	1	United States
United States	Makenna Marisa	G	*2025 – 2026	1	United States
United States	Ally Malott	F	2016 – 2019	2	United States
United States	Megan McConnell	G	*2025 – 2026	1	United States
United States	Aari McDonald	G	2023 – 2024	1	United States
United States	Imani McGee-Stafford	C	2019 – 2020	1	United States
United States	Latonya McGhee	F	1995	1	United States
United States	Kaili McLaren	F	2018 – 2019	1	United States
United States	Brittany McPhee	G	2018 – 2019	1	United States
United States	Laurin Mincy	G	2017 – 2019	2	United States
United States	Tiffany Mitchell	G	2021 – 2023	2	United States
United States	Jacinta Monroe	F/C	2022 – 2023	1	United States
United States	Corinna Montgomery	F	2011 – 2013	1	United States
United States	Renee Montgomery	G	2015 – 2016	1	United States
United States	Lindsey Moore	G	2014 – 2015	1	United States
United States	Teige Morrell	F	*2019 – 2026	4	United States
United States	Yemiyah Morris	C	*2024 – 2026	2	United States
United States	Nicole Munger	G	*2022 – 2026	4	United States
United States	Olivia Nelson-Ododa	F	2022 – 2023	1	United States
United States	Natalie Novosel	G	2013 – 2017	4	United States
United States	Lucy Olsen	G	*2025 – 2026	1	United States
United States	Kayla Pedersen	F	2013 – 2019	3	United States
United States	Haley Peters	F	*2025 – 2026	1	United States
United States	Annalise Pickrel	F	2014 – 2016	2	United States
United States	Alissa Pili	F	*2025 – 2026	1	United States
United States	Colleen Planeta	F	2016 – 2019	4	United States
United States	Lindsey Pluimer	F	2008 – 2009	1	United States
United States	Cappie Pondexter	G	2014 – 2015	1	United States
United States	Chelsea Poppens	G	2013 – 2014	1	United States
United States	Rhonda Price	F	2008 – 2009	1	United States
United States	Kristen Rasmussen	C	2006 – 2007	1	United States
United States	DiDi Richards	F	2023 – 2024	1	United States
United States	Hannah Richards	F	2014 – 2015	1	United States
United States	Trina Roberts	F	1987 – 1994	8	United States
United States	Ashley Robinson	C	2010 – 2011	1	United States
United States	Mikaela Ruef	F	2014 – 2025	8	United States
United States	Leah Rush	F	2009	1	United States
United States	Mercedes Russell	C	2019 – 2024	2	United States
United States	Robbi Ryan	G	2022 – 2023	1	United States
United States	Kathleen Scheer	G	2012 – 2015	3	United States
United States	Alison Schwagmeyer	G/F	2017 – 2023	5	United States
United States	Vanessa Selden	G	1994	1	United States
United States	Chay Shegog	C	2013 – 2014	1	United States
United States	Kylee Shook	C	2021 – 2022	1	United States
United States	Dymond Simon	G	2011	1	United States
United States	Hannah Sjerven	F/C	2022 – 2023	1	United States
United States	Brittany Smart	G	2015 – 2023	8	United States
United States	Katrina Springer	C	1995	1	United States
United States	DeNesha Stallworth	F	2015 – 2016	1	United States
United States	Takia Starks	G	2009 – 2010	1	United States
United States	Kayla Steindl	F	2012 – 2020	7	United States
United States	Serena Sundell	G	2025	1	United States
United States	Sug Sutton	G	2021 – 2022	1	United States
United States	Carolyn Swords	C	2015 – 2016	1	United States
United States	April Sykes	G	2012 – 2013	1	United States
United States	Brittney Sykes	G	2021 – 2022	1	United States
United States	Asia Taylor	F	2016 – 2019	3	United States
United States	Celeste Taylor	G	2024 – 2025	1	United States
United States	Unique Thompson	F	*2025 – 2026	1	United States
United States	Kayla Thornton	F	2022 – 2023	1	Germany
United States	Joslyn Tinkle	F	2015 – 2016	1	Sweden
United States	Rebecca Tobin	F/C	2018 – 2019	2	United States
United States	Barbara Turner	G/F	2018 – 2019	1	United States
United States	Brianna Turner	F	*2019 – 2025	4	United States
United States	Mikayla Vaughn	F	2024 – 2025	1	United States
United States	DeMya Walker	F	2010 – 2011	1	United States
United States	Stephanie Watts	G	2021	1	United States
United States	Kathryn Westbeld	F	2019 – 2020	1	United States
United States	Emilee Whittle-Harmon	F	2021 – 2023	2	United States
United States	Sydney Wiese	G	2017 – 2018	1	United States
United States	Brittany Wilkins	G	2007 – 2012	2	United States
United States	Courtney Williams	G	2017 – 2018	1	United States
United States	Kiana Williams	G	2021 – 2022	1	United States
United States	Jocelyn Willoughby	F	2022 – 2024	2	United States
United States	Monica Wright	G	2012 – 2016	2	United States
United States	Jackie Young	G	2022	1	United States

== See also ==
- List of WNBL awards
- List of Australian WNBA players
- List of WNBA players born outside the United States
