= Mellars =

Mellars is a surname. Notable people with this surname include:

- Charmian Mellars (born 1979), New Zealand professional basketball player
- Sir Paul Mellars (1939–2022), British archaeologist, professor of prehistory and human evolution at the University of Cambridge
- Peter Mellars, New Zealand rugby league footballer and administrator
- Vince Mellars (born 1984), New Zealand rugby league and rugby union footballer

== See also ==
- Tamás Mellár (born 1954), Hungarian economist, statistician, professor and politician
