= Christchurch Sirens =

New Zealand basketball team

- Leagues: WNBL
- Founded: 2007
- Dissolved: 2008
- Arena: Westpac Arena (2007); Cowles Stadium (2007–2008)
- Team colors: Red; Black
- Head coach: Leigh Gooding
- Website: Official website at the Wayback Machine (archived July 21, 2008)

The Christchurch Sirens are a defunct New Zealand professional basketball team based in Christchurch, New Zealand. The Sirens competed for the 2007–08 season in the Women's National Basketball League (WNBL) and folded after one season due to financial pressures. They were the first and to date only New Zealand team to compete in the WNBL. Their home stadium was initially the Westpac Arena before relocating to Cowles Stadium in November 2007 following venue upgrades. The Sirens finished eighth in their only season, with a record of 9 wins and 15 losses.

The WNBL decided in October 2006 to add the Sirens along with the Bendigo Spirit to the league for the 2007–08 season. The Sirens were intended to serve as a pathway towards the Tall Ferns. Their name was inspired by the mythological sirens and their red and black colours were regionally associated with Christchurch and Canterbury.

After one season, the Sirens were unable to secure sponsors to raise the estimated NZD$600,000 required to stay in the league. The team had to pay travel equalisation alongside all 10 WNBL teams, a new entrant team levy, and a special fee as a New Zealand team in the Australian league. Basketball New Zealand decided against bailing the team out as they were short on reserves and couldn't justify the risk. In spite of the team's collapse, Basketball New Zealand still had to pay NZD$250,000 to Basketball Australia in accordance with terms of its five-year licence agreement, including an annual AUD$50,000 entry fee for 4 years.

== Roster ==
2007–08 Christchurch Sirens roster
Players
Coaches

Pos.	No.	Nat.	Name	Ht.
G	4	(New Zealand)	Wharemate, Noni	1.71 m (5 ft 7 in)
F/C	6	(United States)	Augustine, Lamisha (I)	1.84 m (6 ft 0 in)
F	7	(New Zealand)	Purcell, Natalie	1.82 m (6 ft 0 in)
G/F	8	(New Zealand)	Edmondson, Antonia	1.81 m (5 ft 11 in)
F	9	(New Zealand)	Kerr, Aneka	1.83 m (6 ft 0 in)
F	10	(New Zealand)	Wallbutton, Lisa	1.83 m (6 ft 0 in)
G	11	(New Zealand)	McMeeken-Ruscoe, Kate (C)	1.75 m (5 ft 9 in)
G	12	(New Zealand)	Bates, Suzie	1.75 m (5 ft 9 in)
F	13	(New Zealand)	Wilkins, Donna	1.85 m (6 ft 1 in)
G/F	15	(New Zealand)	Richards, Georgia
G	21	(New Zealand)	Moore, Natalie	1.78 m (5 ft 10 in)
G	23	(United States)	Awkward, Ashley (I)	1.68 m (5 ft 6 in)
C	31	(New Zealand)	Kingi, Karlene	1.88 m (6 ft 2 in)
G		(New Zealand)	Purcell, Charmian	1.80 m (5 ft 11 in)

Head coach

- (Australia) Leigh Gooding

Legend

- (C) Team captain
- (DP) Development player
- (I) Import player
- Injured

- Roster
Updated: 7 April 2024
