= Basketball at the 2012 Summer Olympics – Women's qualification =

The qualification for the Basketball at the 2012 Summer Olympics – Women's tournament took place from 2010–2012; all five FIBA (International Basketball Federation) zones sent in teams.

The first qualifying tournament was the 2010 FIBA World Championship for Women in which the champion was guaranteed of a place in the Olympics. Throughout the next two years, several regional tournaments served as qualification for the zonal tournaments, which doubled as continental championships, to determine which teams would participate in the 2012 London Summer Olympics.

== Qualification ==
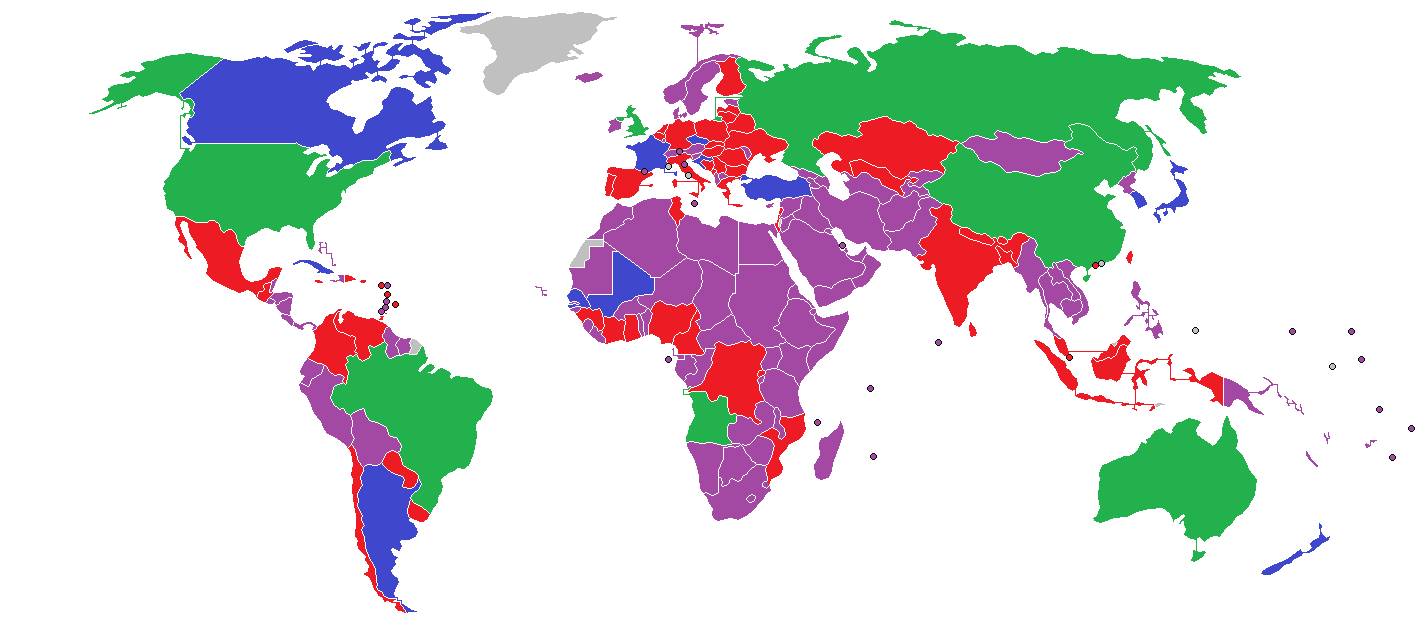
Current qualifying situation.

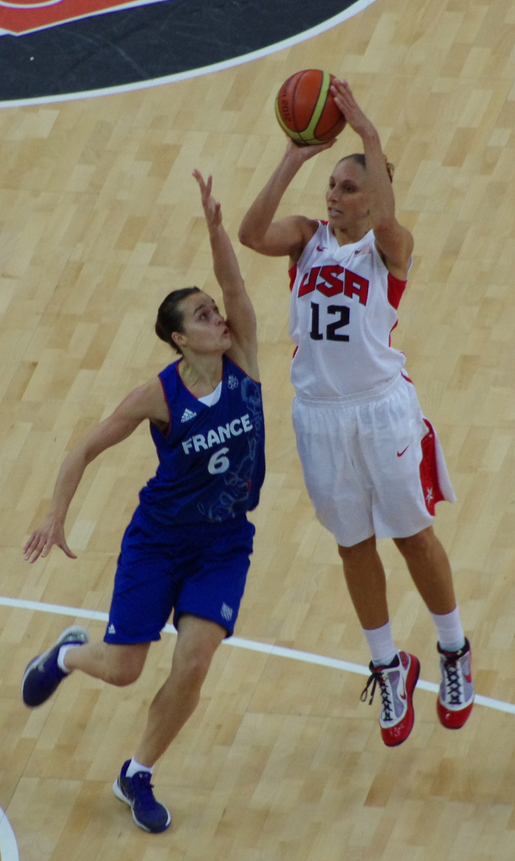
2012 Summer Olympics finale, Diana Taurasi (USA) and Clémence Beikes (France)

=== Outright qualification ===
A total of 12 teams took part in the Olympics, with each NOC potentially nominating one team. The host nation (Great Britain) qualified automatically as hosts.

There were a total of 5 zonal tournaments (doubling as continental championships) that determined the qualifying teams, with a total of 5 teams qualifying outright. Each zone was allocated with the following qualifying berths:

- FIBA Africa: 1 team (Champion)
- FIBA Americas: 1 teams (Champion)
- FIBA Asia: 1 team (Champion)
- FIBA Europe: 1 teams (Champion)
- FIBA Oceania: 1 team (Champion)

Furthermore, the current world champion, United States qualified automatically by winning at the 2010 FIBA World Championship for Women.

=== Qualification via the wild card tournament ===
The additional five teams were determined at the 2012 FIBA World Olympic Qualifying Tournament for Women, with the best non-qualifying teams participating from teams that did not qualify outright. Each zone was allocated with the following berths:

- FIBA Africa: 2 teams
- FIBA Americas: 3 teams
- FIBA Asia: 2 teams
- FIBA Europe: 4 teams
- FIBA Oceania: 1 team

== Summary ==
Qualified for the Olympics outright
Qualified for the Olympics automatically as hosts
Qualified for the Wild card tournament

These are the final standings of the various Olympic qualifying tournaments. The venues are as follows, with the city of the knockout stage mentioned first:

- 2010 FIBA World Championship for Women: Brno, Karlovy Vary, Ostrava (Czech Republic)
- 2011 FIBA Africa Championship for Women: Bamako (Mali)
- 2011 FIBA Americas Championship for Women: Neiva (Colombia)
- 2011 FIBA Asia Championship for Women: Ōmura (Japan)
- EuroBasket Women 2011: Bydgoszcz, Katowice, Łódź (Poland)
- 2011 FIBA Oceania Championship for Women: Melbourne, Brisbane, Sydney (Australia)
- 2012 FIBA World Olympic Qualifying Tournament for Women: Ankara (Turkey)

Rank	World	Africa	Americas	Asia	Europe	Oceania	Wild Card
1st	United States	Angola	Brazil	China	Russia	Australia	France; Czech Rep. Croatia; Turkey (All ranked 1st)
2nd	Czech Rep.	Senegal	Argentina	South Korea	Turkey	New Zealand	France; Czech Rep. Croatia; Turkey (All ranked 1st)
3rd	Spain	Mali	Canada	Japan	France		France; Czech Rep. Croatia; Turkey (All ranked 1st)
4th	Belarus	Nigeria	Cuba	Chinese Taipei	Czech Rep.		France; Czech Rep. Croatia; Turkey (All ranked 1st)
5th	Australia	Mozambique	Puerto Rico	Lebanon	Croatia		Canada
6th	France	Cameroon	Mexico	India	Montenegro		Japan
7th	Russia	DR Congo	Colombia	Malaysia	Lithuania		South Korea; Argentina (All ranked 7th)
8th	South Korea	Ivory Coast	Jamaica	Kazakhstan	Latvia		South Korea; Argentina (All ranked 7th)
9th	Brazil	Rwanda	Paraguay	Indonesia	Belarus; Great Britain; Spain; Poland (All ranked 9th)		Mali; Mozambique; New Zealand; Puerto Rico (All ranked 9th)
10th	Japan	Tunisia	Chile	Uzbekistan	Belarus; Great Britain; Spain; Poland (All ranked 9th)		Mali; Mozambique; New Zealand; Puerto Rico (All ranked 9th)
11th	Greece	Guinea		Singapore	Belarus; Great Britain; Spain; Poland (All ranked 9th)		Mali; Mozambique; New Zealand; Puerto Rico (All ranked 9th)
12th	Canada	Ghana		Sri Lanka	Belarus; Great Britain; Spain; Poland (All ranked 9th)		Mali; Mozambique; New Zealand; Puerto Rico (All ranked 9th)
13th	China				Greece; Slovakia; Germany; Israel (All ranked 13th)		
14th	Argentina				Greece; Slovakia; Germany; Israel (All ranked 13th)		
15th	Mali				Greece; Slovakia; Germany; Israel (All ranked 13th)		
16th	Senegal				Greece; Slovakia; Germany; Israel (All ranked 13th)		

== Wild card tournament ==
This tournament consisted of 12 teams of which the top five teams earned a place in the Olympic Basketball tournament. It was held 25 June – 1 July 2012 in Ankara, Turkey. The top eight teams qualified for the knockout round. All four quarterfinal winners advanced to the Olympics, then the four quarterfinal losers played two rounds to allocate the final slot. The four European teams won their quarterfinal matches, and Canada qualified for the final slot.
