= 2009 FIBA Oceania Championship for Women =

Basketball competition

FIBA Oceania Championship for Women 2009
13th FIBA Oceanian Women's Basketball Championship

Tournament details
- Host countries: Australia; New Zealand
- Dates: 31 August – 2 September
- Teams: 2 (from 21 federations)
- Venues: 2 (in 2 host cities)

Final positions
- Champions: Australia (12th title)

The 2009 FIBA Oceania Championship for Women was the 13th edition of the tournament. The tournament featured a two-game series between Australia and New Zealand. Game one was held in Wellington, New Zealand and game two in Canberra, Australia.

== Results ==
31 August 2009
19:30

Report

Australia	98–48	New Zealand
Scoring by quarter: 16–9, 29–16, 16–31, 7–22
Pts: Edmonson 34; Rebs: Taylor 9 Asts: McMeeken-Ruscoe 2		Pts: Cambage 22; Rebs: Grima 10; Asts: Poto 5

Wellington

2 September 2009
19:00

Report

New Zealand	57–97	Australia
Scoring by quarter: 15–27, 26–12, 14–19, 16–25
Pts: Bibby 19; Rebs: Poto 9 Asts: Richards 4		Pts: Edmonson 11; Rebs: Wallbutton 7 Asts: Edmonson 3

Canberra
