= 1993 FIBA Oceania Championship for Women =

FIBA Oceania Championship for Women 1993
6th FIBA Oceanian Women's Basketball Championship

Tournament details
- Host country: New Zealand
- Dates: 7–10 June
- Teams: 2
- Venue(s): 1 (in 1 host city)

Final positions
- Champions: New Zealand (1st title)

The FIBA Oceania Championship for Women 1993 was the qualifying tournament of FIBA Oceania for the 1994 FIBA World Championship for Women. The tournament was held in Auckland. New Zealand won its first Oceania Championship to qualify for the World Championship.

== Results ==
7 June

New Zealand	120–56	Samoa

8 June

Samoa	61–106	New Zealand

== Championship ==
10 June

Samoa	58–120	New Zealand

1993 Oceanian champions

New Zealand
First title
