= Kirstin Daly-Taylor =

New Zealand basketball player and coach

Kirstin Marie Daly-Taylor (born 17 May 1969) is a New Zealand basketball coach and former international player who competed in the 1994 FIBA World Championship and the 2000 Summer Olympics for the Tall Ferns.

In December 2015, Daly-Taylor was named the head coach of the Hawke's Bay Hawks for the next five years, becoming one of the rare women to take control of a men's team at a domestic level. In her first season at the helm in 2016, the Hawks went 0–18 to become just the fourth side in NBL history to go an entire season without a win. Things did not get better for Daly-Taylor in 2017, as the Hawks started the season with a 1–6 record. Amid allegations she had lost the respect of some players, on 26 April 2017, she handed in her resignation following the team's Anzac Day loss to the Canterbury Rams in Napier.
