= 2015 FIBA Oceania Women's Championship =

Basketball championship

16th FIBA Oceanian Women's Basketball Championship

Tournament details
- Host countries: Australia; New Zealand
- City: Melbourne; Tauranga
- Dates: 15–17 August
- Teams: 2 (from 1 confederation)
- Venues: 2 (in 2 host cities)

Final positions
- Champions: Australia (15th title)
- Runners-up: New Zealand

Tournament statistics
- Top scorer: (Australia) Suzy Batkovic (15.5)
- Top rebounds: (New Zealand) Penina Davidson (10.5)
- Top assists: (Australia) Tessa Lavey (6.0)
- PPG (Team): Australia (70.5)
- RPG (Team): New Zealand (40.5)
- APG (Team): Australia (19.0)

Official website
- FIBA (Wayback Machine)

The 2015 FIBA Oceania Women's Championship was the 16th and the last edition of the Oceanian women's basketball championship. Held in August 2015, it took the form of a two-game series between the Australian Opals and New Zealand Tall Ferns. It served as the qualifying tournament of FIBA Oceania for basketball at the 2016 Summer Olympics in Rio de Janeiro. The first game was in Melbourne, Australia, on 15 August, the second in Tauranga, New Zealand, on 17 August. The Australian Opals won both games, and qualified for the Olympics, while the losing Tall Ferns qualified for the 2016 FIBA World Olympic Qualifying Tournament for Women, the final qualifying tournament for the 2016 Olympics.

== Venues ==
Melbourne	2015 FIBA Oceania Women's Championship (Australia and New Zealand)	Tauranga
Rod Laver Arena	2015 FIBA Oceania Women's Championship (Australia and New Zealand)	ASB arena
Capacity: 14,820	2015 FIBA Oceania Women's Championship (Australia and New Zealand)	capacity 3,116

== Results ==
Team 1	Agg.	Team 2	1st leg	2nd leg
Australia	141–104	New Zealand	61–41	80–63

=== Game 1 ===
All times are local (UTC+10)

Nine Network

15 August 2015
18:30

Boxscore

Australia	61–41	New Zealand
Scoring by quarter: 15–5, 14–12, 21–12, 11–12
Pts: Batkovic 16; Rebs: Lavey 11; Asts: Madgen 6		Pts: Cocks 7 Rebs: Davidson 9 Asts: Cocks 3

Rod Laver Arena, Melbourne
Attendance: 13,000

=== Game 2 ===
All times are local (UTC+12).

Nine Network

17 August 2015
19:30

Boxscore

New Zealand	63–80	Australia
Scoring by quarter: 14–14, 19–26, 14–18, 16–22
Pts: Cocks 21; Rebs: Davidson 12; Asts: Cocks 3		Pts: Hodges 22; Rebs: Hodges & Lavey 5 Asts: Lavey 7
Australia wins series 2–0

ASB Arena, Tauranga

== Rosters ==
=== Australia ===
Australian Opals - 2015 FIBA Oceania Women's Championship roster
Players
Coaches

Pos.	No.	Name	Age – Date of birth	Height	Club	Ctr.
G	4	Kelly Wilson	30 – 1 January 1985	1.70 m (5 ft 7 in)	Bendigo Spirit	(Australia)
G	5	Tessa Lavey	22 – 29 March 1993	1.71 m (5 ft 7 in)	Bendigo Spirit	(Australia)
G	6	Tess Madgen	25 – 12 August 1990	1.80 m (5 ft 11 in)	Melbourne Boomers	(Australia)
G	7	Stephanie Talbot	21 – 15 June 1994	1.86 m (6 ft 1 in)	Canberra Capitals	(Australia)
G	8	Suzy Batkovic	34 – 17 December 1980	1.93 m (6 ft 4 in)	Townsville Fire	(Australia)
G	9	Natalie Burton	26 – 23 March 1989	1.94 m (6 ft 4 in)	Perth Lynx	(Australia)
F	10	Rachel Jarry	23 – 6 December 1991	1.86 m (6 ft 1 in)	Melbourne Boomers	(Australia)
F	11	Laura Hodges	31 – 13 December 1983	1.90 m (6 ft 3 in)	Bourges Basket	(France)
G	12	Belinda Snell	34 – 10 January 1981	1.82 m (6 ft 0 in)	Bendigo Spirit	(Australia)
G	13	Katie-Rae Ebzery	25 – 8 January 1990	1.78 m (5 ft 10 in)	Sydney Flames	(Australia)
F	14	Alice Kunek	24 – 6 January 1991	1.87 m (6 ft 2 in)	Melbourne Boomers	(Australia)
F	15	Sara Blicavs	22 – 15 February 1993	1.89 m (6 ft 2 in)	Melbourne Boomers	(Australia)

Head coach

- Brendan Joyce

Assistant coach(es)

- Scott Richard Butler
- Lori Chizik
- Damian Cotter

Legend

- Club – describes last
  club before the tournament
- Age – describes age
  on 15 August 2015

=== New Zealand ===
New Zealand Tall Ferns - 2015 FIBA Oceania Women's Championship roster
Players
Coaches

Pos.	No.	Name	Age – Date of birth	Height	Club	Ctr.
F	1	Jessica Bygate	23 – 10 January 1992	1.85 m (6 ft 1 in)	Gladstone Power	(Australia)
G	2	Micaela Cocks	29 – 2 May 1986	1.74 m (5 ft 9 in)	Townsville Fire	(Australia)
F	4	Kalani Purcell	20 – 13 January 1995	1.85 m (6 ft 1 in)	BYU Cougars	(United States)
F	6	Tessa Boagni	19 – 12 February 1996	1.88 m (6 ft 2 in)	Cal State Northridge Matadors	(United States)
G	7	Jordan Hunter	24 – 20 August 1990	1.72 m (5 ft 8 in)	Auckland Lady Hawks	(New Zealand)
F	8	Natalie Taylor	32 – 24 December 1982	1.82 m (6 ft 0 in)	Gladstone Power	(Australia)
G	9	Stella Beck	19 – 25 September 1995	1.80 m (5 ft 11 in)	Saint Mary's Gaels	(United States)
F	10	Lisa Wallbutton	29 – 14 January 1986	1.83 m (6 ft 0 in)	Willetton Tigers	(Australia)
G	11	Samara Gallaher	22 – 2 October 1992	1.78 m (5 ft 10 in)	Otago Gold Rush	(New Zealand)
F	12	Penina Davidson	19 – 2 September 1995	1.83 m (6 ft 0 in)	California Golden Bears	(United States)
F	14	Chevanna Paalvast	23 – 1 September 1991	1.80 m (5 ft 11 in)	Southern Peninsula Sharks	(Australia)
C	15	Megan Craig	22 – 11 February 1993	2.03 m (6 ft 8 in)	Lakeside Lightning	(Australia)

Head coach

- (New Zealand) Kereama Kennedy

Assistant coaches

- (Australia) Chris Lucas
- (New Zealand) Aik Ho

Legend

- (C) Team captain
- Club – describes last
  club before the tournament
- Age – describes age
  on 15 August 2015

Source: "2015 FIBA Oceania Championship for Women - Players". FIBA. Archived from the original on 6 May 2021.

== Final rankings ==
#	Team	W–L	Qualification
1st place, gold medalist(s)	Australia	2–0	Qualified to the Olympics
2nd place, silver medalist(s)	New Zealand	0–2	Qualified to Final Olympic Qualifying Tournament
