= 2005 FIBA Oceania Championship for Women =

FIBA Oceania Championship for Women 2005
11th FIBA Oceanian Women's Basketball Championship

Tournament details
- Host country: New Zealand
- Dates: 24–28 August
- Teams: 2 (from 21 federations)
- Venues: 3 (in 3 host cities)

Final positions
- Champions: Australia (10th title)

The FIBA Oceania Championship for Women 2005 was the qualifying tournament of FIBA Oceania for the 2006 FIBA World Championship for Women. The tournament, a best-of-three series between Australia and New Zealand, was held in Palmerston, Napier and Auckland. Australia won all three games. Both teams qualified for the 2006 FIBA World Championship for Women.

== Results ==
24 August

| New Zealand | 51–77 | Australia |

26 August

| Australia | 75–67 | New Zealand |

28 August

| New Zealand | 38–67 | Australia |
Australia wins series, 3–0

2005 Oceanian champions

Australia
Tenth title
