= Olga Sokolovskaya =

Ukrainian-born Russian basketball player

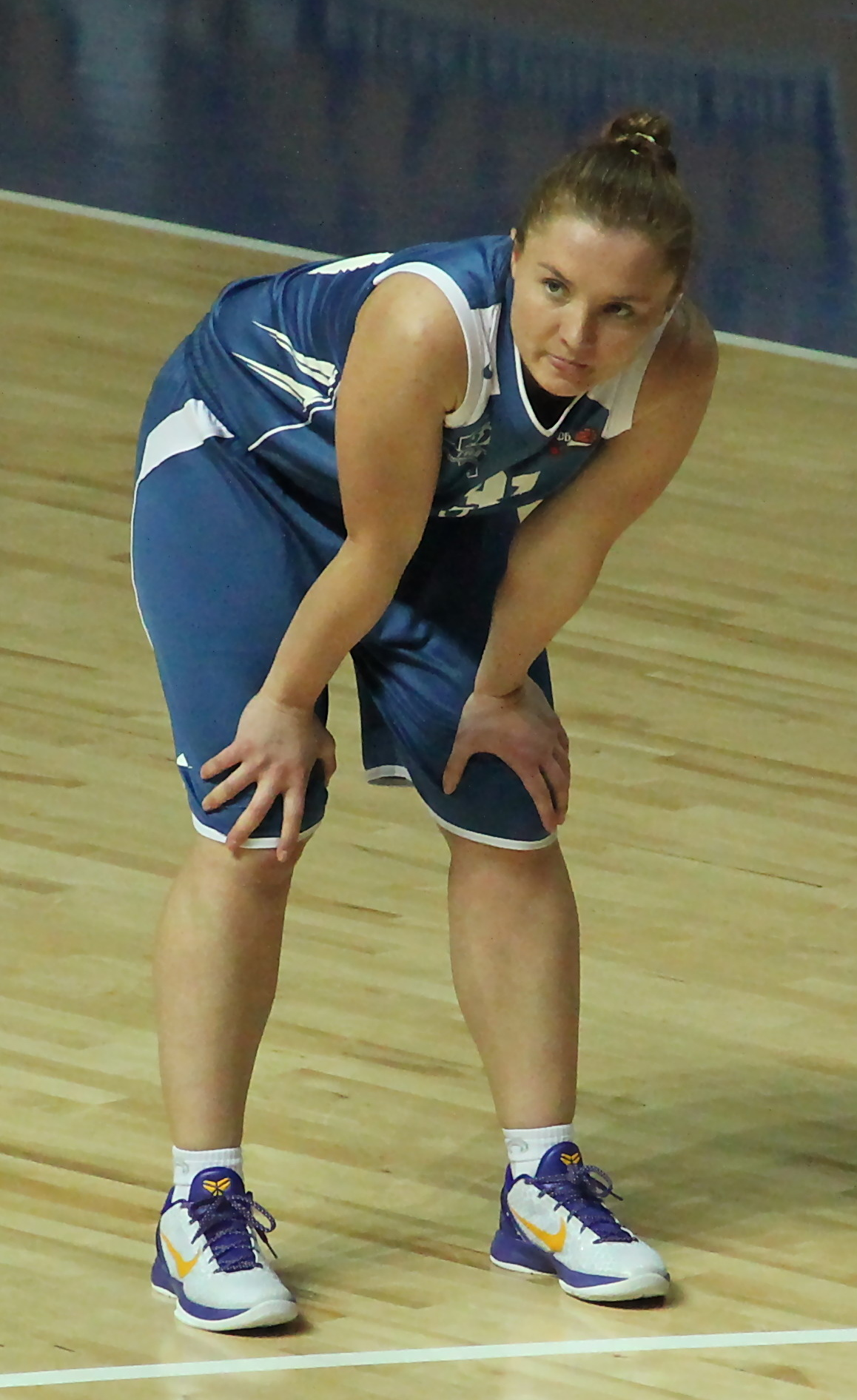
- Sokolovskaya in 2012

Personal information
- Born: 26 July 1991 (age 34) Ukraine
- Height: 173 cm (5 ft 8 in)
- Weight: 66 kg (146 lb)

Sport
- Sport: Basketball
- Club: WBC Dynamo Novosibirsk

Olga Borisovna Sokolovskaya (Russian: Ольга Борисовна Соколовская, born 26 July 1991) is a Ukrainian-born Russian basketball defender. She was part of the Russian team that won the silver medal at the 2011 European Junior Championships. As a senior, she competed with WBC Dynamo Novosibirsk in the EuroCup in 2011–2014.

Her elder sister Irina is an Olympic basketball player, and her father Boris is a national basketball coach.
