= 2001 FIBA Oceania Championship for Women =

FIBA Oceania Championship for Women 2001
9th FIBA Oceanian Women's Basketball Championship

Tournament details
- Host country: New Zealand
- Dates: 14–15 September
- Teams: 2 (from 21 federations)
- Venues: 2 (in 2 host cities)

Final positions
- Champions: Australia (8th title)

The 2001 FIBA Oceania Championship for Women was the 9th edition of the basketball tournament. The tournament featured a two-game series between Australia and New Zealand. Games one and two were held in Invercargill and Christchurch, New Zealand.

== Results ==
14 September 2001

Australia	97–61	New Zealand

Christchurch

15 September 2001

New Zealand	55–102	Australia

Christchurch

2001 Oceanian champions

Australia
Eighth title
