= Basketball at the 2008 Summer Olympics – Men's team rosters =

Competing teams.

This is a list of the players who were on the rosters of the given teams who participated in the 2008 Beijing Olympics for Men's Basketball.

== Group A ==
=== Argentina ===
The following is the Argentina roster in the men's basketball tournament of the 2008 Summer Olympics.

Argentina men's national basketball team – 2008 Summer Olympics roster
Players
Coaches

Pos.	No.	Name	Age – Date of birth	Height	Club	Ctr.
F/C	4	Luis Scola (C)	28 – April 30, 1980	6 ft 9 in (2.06 m)	Houston Rockets	(United States)
SG	5	Manu Ginóbili	31 – July 28, 1977	6 ft 6 in (1.98 m)	San Antonio Spurs	(United States)
C	6	Román González	30 – January 28, 1978	6 ft 11 in (2.11 m)	Peñarol	(Argentina)
C	7	Fabricio Oberto	33 – March 21, 1975	6 ft 10 in (2.08 m)	San Antonio Spurs	(United States)
PG	8	Pablo Prigioni	31 – May 17, 1977	6 ft 4 in (1.93 m)	TAU Cerámica	(Spain)
PG	9	Antonio Porta	24 – October 28, 1983	6 ft 3 in (1.91 m)	Spartak Saint Petersburg	(Russia)
SG	10	Carlos Delfino	25 – August 29, 1982	6 ft 7 in (2.01 m)	Khimki	(Russia)
PG	11	Paolo Quinteros	29 – January 15, 1979	6 ft 2 in (1.88 m)	Basket Zaragoza	(Spain)
PF	12	Leonardo Gutiérrez	30 – May 16, 1978	6 ft 8 in (2.03 m)	Atenas	(Argentina)
SF	13	Andrés Nocioni	28 – November 30, 1979	6 ft 8 in (2.03 m)	Chicago Bulls	(United States)
C	14	Juan Pedro Gutiérrez	24 – October 10, 1983	6 ft 9 in (2.06 m)	Granada	(Spain)
SF	15	Federico Kammerichs	28 – June 21, 1980	6 ft 9 in (2.06 m)	Regatas	(Argentina)

Head coach

- (Argentina) Sergio Hernández

Assistant coach(es)

- (Argentina) Julio Lamas

Legend

- (C) Team captain
- Club – describes last
  club before the tournament
- Age – describes age
  on August 9, 2008

=== Australia ===
The following is the Australia roster in the men's basketball tournament of the 2008 Summer Olympics.

Australia men's national basketball team – 2008 Summer Olympics roster
Players
Coaches

Pos.	No.	Name	Age – Date of birth	Height	Club	Ctr.
C	4	Chris Anstey	33 – January 1, 1975	7 ft 0 in (2.13 m)	Melbourne Tigers	(Australia)
PG	5	Patrick Mills	19 – August 11, 1988	6 ft 0 in (1.83 m)	Saint Mary's Gaels	(United States)
C	6	Andrew Bogut	23 – November 28, 1984	7 ft 0 in (2.13 m)	Milwaukee Bucks	(United States)
G/F	7	Joe Ingles	20 – October 2, 1987	6 ft 8 in (2.03 m)	South Dragons	(Australia)
G/F	8	Brad Newley	23 – February 18, 1985	6 ft 7 in (2.01 m)	Panellinios	(Greece)
G	9	C. J. Bruton	32 – December 13, 1975	6 ft 2 in (1.88 m)	New Zealand Breakers	(New Zealand)
F	10	David Barlow	24 – October 22, 1983	6 ft 9 in (2.06 m)	Melbourne Tigers	(Australia)
SF	11	Mark Worthington	25 – June 8, 1983	6 ft 7 in (2.01 m)	South Dragons	(Australia)
G/F	12	Glen Saville	32 – January 17, 1976	6 ft 6 in (1.98 m)	Wollongong Hawks	(Australia)
F/C	13	David Andersen	28 – June 23, 1980	6 ft 11 in (2.11 m)	FC Barcelona	(Spain)
F/C	14	Matthew Nielsen (C)	30 – February 3, 1978	6 ft 10 in (2.08 m)	BC Lietuvos rytas	(Lithuania)
F	15	Shawn Redhage	27 – January 21, 1981	6 ft 8 in (2.03 m)	Perth Wildcats	(Australia)

Head coach

- (Australia) Brian Goorjian

Assistant coach(es)

- (Australia) Brendan Joyce
- (Australia) Gordon McLeod

Legend

- (C) Team captain
- Club – describes last
  club before the tournament
- Age – describes age
  on August 9, 2008

=== Croatia ===
The following is the Croatia roster in the men's basketball tournament of the 2008 Summer Olympics.

Croatia men's national basketball team – 2008 Summer Olympics roster
Players
Coaches

Pos.	No.	Name	Age – Date of birth	Height	Club	Ctr.
PG	4	Roko Ukić	23 – December 5, 1984	6 ft 5 in (1.96 m)	Toronto Raptors	(Canada)
G	5	Davor Kus	30 – July 21, 1978	6 ft 4 in (1.93 m)	Unicaja Málaga	(Spain)
PG	6	Marko Popović	26 – June 12, 1982	6 ft 1 in (1.85 m)	BC Žalgiris	(Lithuania)
SF	7	Marin Rozić	25 – February 14, 1983	6 ft 8 in (2.03 m)	KK Cibona	(Croatia)
F/C	8	Nikola Prkačin	32 – November 15, 1975	6 ft 10 in (2.08 m)	KK Cibona	(Croatia)
G/F	9	Marko Tomas	23 – January 3, 1985	6 ft 7 in (2.01 m)	Real Madrid	(Spain)
G	10	Zoran Planinić	25 – September 12, 1982	6 ft 6 in (1.98 m)	CSKA Moscow	(Russia)
C	11	Sandro Nicević	32 – June 16, 1976	6 ft 11 in (2.11 m)	Beşiktaş	(Turkey)
F	12	Damjan Rudež	22 – June 17, 1986	6 ft 10 in (2.08 m)	KK Union Olimpija	(Slovenia)
PF	13	Marko Banić	23 – August 31, 1984	6 ft 9 in (2.06 m)	iurbentia Bilbao	(Spain)
PF	14	Krešimir Lončar	25 – February 12, 1983	6 ft 11 in (2.11 m)	Lokomotiv Rostov	(Russia)
C	15	Stanko Barać	21 – August 13, 1986	7 ft 1 in (2.16 m)	TAU Ceramica	(Spain)

Head coach

- (Croatia) Jasmin Repeša

Assistant coach(es)

- (Croatia) Dražen Anzulović

Legend

- (C) Team captain
- Club – describes last
  club before the tournament
- Age – describes age
  on August 9, 2008

=== Iran ===
The following is the Iran roster in the men's basketball tournament of the 2008 Summer Olympics.

Iran men's national basketball team – 2008 Summer Olympics roster
Players
Coaches

Pos.	No.	Name	Age – Date of birth	Height	Club	Ctr.
F/C	4	Ali Doraghi	23 – September 20, 1984	6 ft 11 in (2.11 m)	Petrochimi	(Iran)
PG	5	Amir Amini	24 – June 10, 1984	6 ft 3 in (1.91 m)	Kaveh	(Iran)
PG	6	Javad Davari	25 – April 25, 1983	6 ft 1 in (1.85 m)	Petrochimi	(Iran)
PG	7	Mehdi Kamrani	26 – June 1, 1982	5 ft 11 in (1.8 m)	Mahram	(Iran)
SG	8	Saeid Davarpanah	20 – September 7, 1987	6 ft 3 in (1.91 m)	Kaveh	(Iran)
SG	9	Iman Zandi	26 – September 19, 1981	6 ft 2 in (1.88 m)	BEEM	(Iran)
SG	10	Hamed Afagh	25 – February 1, 1983	6 ft 4 in (1.93 m)	Saba Battery	(Iran)
F/C	11	Hamed Sohrabnejad	25 – May 7, 1983	6 ft 9 in (2.06 m)	Mahram	(Iran)
PF	12	Oshin Sahakian	22 – March 21, 1986	6 ft 7 in (2.01 m)	Zob Ahan	(Iran)
C	13	Mousa Nabipour	24 – August 14, 1983	6 ft 11 in (2.11 m)	Kaveh	(Iran)
SF	14	Samad Nikkhah Bahrami (C)	25 – May 11, 1983	6 ft 7 in (2.01 m)	Mahram	(Iran)
C	15	Hamed Haddadi	23 – May 19, 1985	7 ft 2 in (2.18 m)	Saba Battery	(Iran)

Head coach

- (Serbia) Rajko Toroman

Assistant coach(es)

- (Iran) Mehran Hatami
- (Serbia) Srđan Petković

Legend

- (C) Team captain
- nat field describes country
  of last club
  before the tournament
- Age field is age on August 9, 2008

=== Lithuania ===
The following is the Lithuania roster in the men's basketball tournament of the 2008 Summer Olympics.

Lithuania men's national basketball team – 2008 Summer Olympics roster
Players
Coaches

Pos.	No.	Name	Age – Date of birth	Height	Club	Ctr.
PG	4	Rimantas Kaukėnas	31 – April 11, 1977	6 ft 4 in (1.93 m)	Montepaschi Siena	(Italy)
SG	5	Mindaugas Lukauskis	29 – May 19, 1979	6 ft 6 in (1.98 m)	Lietuvos Rytas	(Lithuania)
SF	6	Jonas Mačiulis	23 – February 10, 1985	6 ft 7 in (2.01 m)	BC Žalgiris	(Lithuania)
C	7	Darjuš Lavrinovič	28 – November 1, 1979	6 ft 11 in (2.11 m)	UNICS Kazan	(Russia)
G/F	8	Ramūnas Šiškauskas (C)	29 – September 10, 1978	6 ft 6 in (1.98 m)	CSKA Moscow	(Russia)
G	9	Marius Prekevičius	24 – May 22, 1984	6 ft 5 in (1.96 m)	BC Šiauliai	(Lithuania)
G/F	10	Simas Jasaitis	26 – March 26, 1982	6 ft 8 in (2.03 m)	Joventut Badalona	(Spain)
F	11	Linas Kleiza	23 – January 3, 1985	6 ft 8 in (2.03 m)	Denver Nuggets	(United States)
F/C	12	Kšyštof Lavrinovič	28 – November 1, 1979	6 ft 11 in (2.11 m)	Montepaschi Siena	(Italy)
PG	13	Šarūnas Jasikevičius	32 – March 5, 1976	6 ft 4 in (1.93 m)	Panathinaikos BC	(Greece)
F/C	14	Marijonas Petravičius	28 – October 24, 1979	6 ft 9 in (2.06 m)	Lietuvos Rytas	(Lithuania)
C	15	Robertas Javtokas	28 – March 20, 1980	6 ft 11 in (2.11 m)	Dynamo Moscow	(Russia)

Head coach

- (Lithuania) Ramūnas Butautas

Assistant coach(es)

- (Lithuania) Rimas Kurtinaitis
- (Lithuania) Robertas Kuncaitis
- (Lithuania) Virginijus Mikalauskas

Legend

- (C) Team captain
- Club – describes last
  club before the tournament
- Age – describes age
  on August 9, 2008

=== Russia ===
The following is the Russia roster in the men's basketball tournament of the 2008 Summer Olympics.

Russia men's national basketball team – 2008 Summer Olympics roster
Players
Coaches

Pos.	No.	Name	Age – Date of birth	Height	Club	Ctr.
F	4	Andrey Vorontsevich	21 – July 17, 1987	6 ft 8 in (2.03 m)	CSKA Moscow	(Russia)
PG	5	Jon Robert Holden	31 – August 10, 1976	6 ft 1 in (1.85 m)	CSKA Moscow	(Russia)
G	6	Sergei Bykov	25 – February 26, 1983	6 ft 3 in (1.91 m)	Dynamo Moscow	(Russia)
F	7	Andrei Kirilenko (C)	27 – February 18, 1981	6 ft 10 in (2.08 m)	Utah Jazz	(United States)
C	8	Nikita Morgunov	33 – June 29, 1975	6 ft 11 in (2.11 m)	Lokomotiv Rostov	(Russia)
PG	9	Petr Samoylenko	31 – February 7, 1977	6 ft 2 in (1.88 m)	Dynamo Moscow	(Russia)
F	10	Victor Khryapa	26 – August 3, 1982	6 ft 9 in (2.06 m)	CSKA Moscow	(Russia)
SG	11	Zakhar Pashutin	34 – May 3, 1974	6 ft 5 in (1.96 m)	Spartak Saint Petersburg	(Russia)
SF	12	Sergei Monia	25 – April 15, 1983	6 ft 8 in (2.03 m)	Dynamo Moscow	(Russia)
SG	13	Vitaly Fridzon	22 – October 14, 1985	6 ft 5 in (1.96 m)	BC Khimki	(Russia)
C	14	Aleksey Savrasenko	29 – February 28, 1979	7 ft 1 in (2.16 m)	CSKA Moscow	(Russia)
SF	15	Viktor Keirou	24 – January 31, 1984	6 ft 7 in (2.01 m)	CSKA Moscow	(Russia)

Head coach

- (Israel) David Blatt

Legend

- (C) Team captain
- Club – describes last
  club before the tournament
- Age – describes age
  on August 9, 2008

== Group B ==
=== Angola ===
The following is the Angola roster in the men's basketball tournament of the 2008 Summer Olympics.

Angola men's national basketball team roster – 2008 Summer Olympics roster
Players
Coaches

Pos.	No.	Name	Age – Date of birth	Height	Club	Ctr.
SF	4	Olimpio Cipriano	26 – April 9, 1982	6 ft 4 in (1.93 m)	Primeiro de Agosto	(Angola)
G	5	Armando Costa	25 – June 3, 1983	6 ft 4 in (1.93 m)	Petro Atlético	(Angola)
SG	6	Carlos Morais	22 – October 16, 1985	6 ft 3 in (1.91 m)	Petro Atlético	(Angola)
PG	7	Milton Barros	24 – June 21, 1984	6 ft 1 in (1.85 m)	Petro Atlético	(Angola)
G	8	Luis Costa	30 – June 7, 1978	6 ft 4 in (1.93 m)	Petro Atlético	(Angola)
G	9	Vladimir Geronimo	30 – December 12, 1977	6 ft 4 in (1.93 m)	Primeiro de Agosto	(Angola)
F/C	10	Joaquim Gomes	27 – December 23, 1980	6 ft 8 in (2.03 m)	Primeiro de Agosto	(Angola)
F	11	Felizardo Ambrosio	20 – December 25, 1987	6 ft 7 in (2.01 m)	Primeiro de Agosto	(Angola)
C	12	Abdel Aziz Moussa	28 – April 8, 1980	6 ft 8 in (2.03 m)	Primeiro de Agosto	(Angola)
SG	13	Carlos Almeida (C)	31 – September 24, 1976	6 ft 4 in (1.93 m)	Primeiro de Agosto	(Angola)
F	14	Leonel Paulo	22 – April 30, 1986	6 ft 6 in (1.98 m)	Petro Atlético	(Angola)
F	15	Eduardo Mingas	29 – January 29, 1979	6 ft 7 in (2.01 m)	Petro Atlético	(Angola)

Head coach

- (Portugal) Alberto de Carvalho

Legend

- (C) Team captain
- Club – describes last
  club before the tournament
- Age – describes age
  on August 9, 2008

=== China ===
The following is the China roster in the men's basketball tournament of the 2008 Summer Olympics.

China men's national basketball team – 2008 Summer Olympics roster
Players
Coaches

Pos.	No.	Name	Age – Date of birth	Height	Club	Ctr.
PG	4	Chen Jianghua	19 – March 12, 1989	6 ft 2 in (1.88 m)	Guangdong Southern Tigers	(China)
G	5	Liu Wei (C)	28 – January 15, 1980	6 ft 3 in (1.91 m)	Shanghai Sharks	(China)
PG	6	Zhang Qingpeng	23 – January 23, 1985	6 ft 3 in (1.91 m)	Liaoning Hunters	(China)
G/F	7	Wang Shipeng	25 – April 6, 1983	6 ft 6 in (1.98 m)	Guangdong Southern Tigers	(China)
SF	8	Zhu Fangyu	25 – January 5, 1983	6 ft 7 in (2.01 m)	Guangdong Southern Tigers	(China)
G	9	Sun Yue	22 – November 6, 1985	6 ft 9 in (2.06 m)	Los Angeles Lakers	(United States)
SF	10	Li Nan	31 – September 25, 1976	6 ft 6 in (1.98 m)	Bayi Rockets	(China)
F/C	11	Yi Jianlian	20 – October 27, 1987	7 ft 0 in (2.13 m)	New Jersey Nets	(United States)
SF	12	Wang Lei	21 – August 12, 1986	6 ft 7 in (2.01 m)	Bayi Rockets	(China)
C	13	Yao Ming	27 – September 12, 1980	7 ft 6 in (2.29 m)	Houston Rockets	(United States)
C	14	Wang Zhizhi	29 – July 8, 1979	7 ft 1 in (2.16 m)	Bayi Rockets	(China)
F	15	Du Feng	27 – July 30, 1981	6 ft 9 in (2.06 m)	Guangdong Southern Tigers	(China)

Head coach

- (Lithuania) Jonas Kazlauskas

Assistant coach(es)

- (United States) Donnie Nelson

Legend

- (C) Team captain
- Club – describes last
  club before the tournament
- Age – describes age
  on August 9, 2008

=== Germany ===
The following is the Germany roster in the men's basketball tournament of the 2008 Summer Olympics.

Germany men's national basketball team – 2008 Summer Olympics roster
Players
Coaches

Pos.	No.	Name	Age – Date of birth	Height	Club	Ctr.
F/C	4	Tim Ohlbrecht	19 – August 30, 1988	6 ft 11 in (2.11 m)	Brose Baskets	(Germany)
SF	5	Philip Zwiener	23 – July 23, 1985	6 ft 7 in (2.01 m)	ALBA Berlin	(Germany)
PF	6	Sven Schultze	30 – July 11, 1978	6 ft 10 in (2.08 m)	Olympia Larissa BC	(Greece)
SG	7	Robert Garrett	31 – March 18, 1977	6 ft 4 in (1.93 m)	Brose Baskets	(Germany)
SF	8	Konrad Wysocki	26 – March 28, 1982	6 ft 8 in (2.03 m)	Deutsche Bank Skyliners	(Germany)
G	9	Steffen Hamann	27 – June 14, 1981	6 ft 5 in (1.96 m)	Brose Baskets	(Germany)
G	10	Demond Greene	29 – June 15, 1979	6 ft 1 in (1.85 m)	Brose Baskets	(Germany)
PG	11	Pascal Roller	31 – November 20, 1976	5 ft 11 in (1.8 m)	Deutsche Bank Skyliners	(Germany)
C	12	Chris Kaman	26 – April 28, 1982	7 ft 0 in (2.13 m)	Los Angeles Clippers	(United States)
C	13	Patrick Femerling	33 – March 4, 1975	7 ft 1 in (2.16 m)	ALBA Berlin	(Germany)
PF	14	Dirk Nowitzki (C)	30 – June 19, 1978	7 ft 0 in (2.13 m)	Dallas Mavericks	(United States)
F/C	15	Jan Jagla	27 – June 25, 1981	7 ft 0 in (2.13 m)	Joventut Badalona	(Spain)

Head coach

- (Germany) Dirk Bauermann

Legend

- (C) Team captain
- Club – describes last
  club before the tournament
- Age – describes age
  on August 9, 2008

=== Greece ===
The following is the Greece roster in the men's basketball tournament of the 2008 Summer Olympics.

Greece men's national basketball team – 2008 Summer Olympics roster
Players
Coaches

Pos.	No.	Name	Age – Date of birth	Height	Club	Ctr.
PG	4	Theo Papaloukas (C)	31 – May 8, 1977	6 ft 7 in (2.01 m)	Olympiacos B.C.	(Greece)
F/C	5	Ioannis Bourousis	24 – November 17, 1983	7 ft 1 in (2.16 m)	Olympiacos B.C.	(Greece)
PG	6	Nikos Zisis	24 – August 16, 1983	6 ft 6 in (1.98 m)	PBC CSKA Moscow	(Russia)
PG	7	Vassilis Spanoulis	26 – August 7, 1982	6 ft 4 in (1.93 m)	Panathinaikos BC	(Greece)
F	8	Panagiotis Vasilopoulos	24 – February 8, 1984	6 ft 8 in (2.03 m)	Olympiacos B.C.	(Greece)
PF	9	Antonis Fotsis	27 – April 1, 1981	6 ft 10 in (2.08 m)	Panathinaikos BC	(Greece)
F	10	Giorgos Printezis	23 – February 22, 1985	6 ft 9 in (2.06 m)	Olympiacos B.C.	(Greece)
C	11	Andreas Glyniadakis	26 – August 26, 1981	7 ft 1 in (2.16 m)	Maroussi BC	(Greece)
F/C	12	Kostas Tsartsaris	28 – October 17, 1979	6 ft 11 in (2.11 m)	Panathinaikos BC	(Greece)
G	13	Dimitris Diamantidis	28 – May 6, 1980	6 ft 5 in (1.96 m)	Panathinaikos BC	(Greece)
C	14	Sofoklis Schortsanitis	23 – June 22, 1985	6 ft 10 in (2.08 m)	Olympiacos B.C.	(Greece)
G/F	15	Michalis Pelekanos	27 – May 25, 1981	6 ft 6 in (1.98 m)	Olympiacos B.C.	(Greece)

Head coach

- (Greece) Panagiotis Giannakis

Legend

- (C) Team captain
- Club – describes last
  club before the tournament
- Age – describes age
  on August 9, 2008

=== Spain ===
The following is the Spain roster in the men's basketball tournament of the 2008 Summer Olympics.

Spain men's national basketball team – 2008 Summer Olympics roster
Players
Coaches

Pos.	No.	Name	Age – Date of birth	Height	Club	Ctr.
F/C	4	Pau Gasol	28 – July 6, 1980	7 ft 0 in (2.13 m)	Los Angeles Lakers	(United States)
G/F	5	Rudy Fernandez	23 – April 4, 1985	6 ft 6 in (1.98 m)	Portland Trail Blazers	(United States)
PG	6	Ricky Rubio	17 – October 21, 1990	6 ft 4 in (1.93 m)	Joventut Badalona	(Spain)
G	7	Juan Carlos Navarro	28 – June 13, 1980	6 ft 4 in (1.93 m)	FC Barcelona	(Spain)
PG	8	José Calderón	26 – September 28, 1981	6 ft 3 in (1.91 m)	Toronto Raptors	(Canada)
F/C	9	Felipe Reyes	28 – March 16, 1980	6 ft 9 in (2.06 m)	Real Madrid	(Spain)
SF	10	Carlos Jiménez (C)	32 – February 10, 1976	6 ft 9 in (2.06 m)	CB Málaga	(Spain)
PG	11	Raül López	28 – April 15, 1980	6 ft 0 in (1.83 m)	Real Madrid	(Spain)
SG	12	Berni Rodríguez	28 – June 7, 1980	6 ft 5 in (1.96 m)	CB Málaga	(Spain)
C	13	Marc Gasol	23 – January 29, 1985	7 ft 1 in (2.16 m)	Memphis Grizzlies	(United States)
SF	14	Álex Mumbrú	29 – June 12, 1979	6 ft 7 in (2.01 m)	Real Madrid	(Spain)
PF	15	Jorge Garbajosa	30 – December 19, 1977	6 ft 9 in (2.06 m)	Khimki BC	(Russia)

Head coach

- (Spain) Aíto García Reneses

Assistant coach(es)

- (Spain) Juan Antonio Orenga
- (Spain) Quim Costa

Legend

- (C) Team captain
- Club – describes last
  club before the tournament
- Age – describes age
  on August 9, 2008

=== United States ===
The following is the United States roster in the men's basketball tournament of the 2008 Summer Olympics.

United States men's national basketball team – 2008 Summer Olympics roster
Players
Coaches

Pos.	No.	Name	Age – Date of birth	Height	Club	Ctr.
F	4	Carlos Boozer	26 – November 20, 1981	6 ft 8 in (2.03 m)	Utah Jazz	(United States)
G	5	Jason Kidd	35 – March 23, 1973	6 ft 4 in (1.93 m)	Dallas Mavericks	(United States)
F	6	LeBron James	23 – December 30, 1984	6 ft 8 in (2.03 m)	Cleveland Cavaliers	(United States)
G	7	Deron Williams	24 – June 26, 1984	6 ft 3 in (1.91 m)	Utah Jazz	(United States)
G	8	Michael Redd	28 – August 24, 1979	6 ft 6 in (1.98 m)	Milwaukee Bucks	(United States)
G	9	Dwyane Wade	26 – January 17, 1982	6 ft 4 in (1.93 m)	Miami Heat	(United States)
G	10	Kobe Bryant (C)	29 – August 23, 1978	6 ft 6 in (1.98 m)	Los Angeles Lakers	(United States)
C	11	Dwight Howard	22 – December 8, 1985	6 ft 11 in (2.11 m)	Orlando Magic	(United States)
F/C	12	Chris Bosh	24 – March 24, 1984	6 ft 11 in (2.11 m)	Toronto Raptors	(Canada)
G	13	Chris Paul	23 – May 6, 1985	6 ft 0 in (1.83 m)	New Orleans Hornets	(United States)
F	14	Tayshaun Prince	28 – February 28, 1980	6 ft 9 in (2.06 m)	Detroit Pistons	(United States)
F	15	Carmelo Anthony	24 – May 29, 1984	6 ft 7 in (2.01 m)	Denver Nuggets	(United States)

Head coach

- (United States) Mike Krzyzewski

Assistant coach(es)

- (United States) Jim Boeheim
- (United States) Nate McMillan
- (United States) Mike D'Antoni

Legend

- (C) Team captain
- Club – describes last
  club before the tournament
- Age – describes age
  on August 9, 2008

== See also ==
- Wheelchair basketball at the 2008 Summer Paralympics – Rosters
