= Wheelchair basketball at the 2008 Summer Paralympics – Rosters =

This is a list of the players who were on the rosters of the given teams that participated in the 2008 Beijing Paralympics for wheelchair basketball.

- Wheelchair basketball at the 2008 Summer Paralympics – Men's team rosters
- Wheelchair basketball at the 2008 Summer Paralympics – Women's team rosters

== See also ==
- Basketball at the 2008 Summer Olympics – Men's team rosters
- Basketball at the 2008 Summer Olympics – Women's team rosters
