= 1997 FIBA Oceania Championship for Women =

FIBA Oceania Championship for Women 1997
8th FIBA Oceanian Women's Basketball Championship

Tournament details
- Host country: New Zealand
- Dates: 1–4 June
- Teams: 3 (from 21 federations)
- Venue(s): 2 (in 2 host cities)

Final positions
- Champions: Australia (7th title)

The FIBA Oceania Championship for Women 1997 was the qualifying tournament of FIBA Oceania for the 1998 FIBA World Championship for Women, and the 2000 Summer Olympics. The basketball tournament was held in Wellington and Palmerston North. Australia won the tournament to qualify for the World Championship and New Zealand qualified for the Olympics.

== Results ==
1 June

New Zealand	124–21	New Caledonia

2 June

Australia	108–56	New Zealand

3 June

Australia	140–23	New Caledonia

== Championship ==
4 June

Australia	99–61	New Zealand

== Final standings ==
Rank	Team	Record
1	Australia	3–0
2	New Zealand	1–2
3	New Caledonia	0–2

Australia qualified for the 1998 FIBA World Championship for Women and 2000 Summer Olympics as host
New Zealand qualified for the 2000 Summer Olympics
