= 1989 FIBA Oceania Championship for Women =

FIBA Oceania Championship for Women 1989
5th FIBA Oceanian Women's Basketball Championship

Tournament details
- Host country: New Zealand
- Dates: 25 – 30 August
- Teams: 2
- Venue(s): 1 (in 1 host city)

Final positions
- Champions: Australia (5th title)

The FIBA Oceania Championship for Women 1989 was the qualifying tournament of FIBA Oceania for the 1990 FIBA World Championship for Women. The tournament, a best-of-three series between Australia and New Zealand, was held in Auckland, New Zealand. Australia won the series 3–0.

== Results ==
25 August

Australia	93–45	New Zealand
Scoring by half: 42-19, 51-26

27 August

Australia	107–59	New Zealand
Scoring by half: 55-29, 52-30

30 August

Australia	80–38	New Zealand
Scoring by half: 23-22, 57-16

1989 Oceanian champions

Australia
Fifth title
