= 1974 FIBA Oceania Championship for Women =

FIBA Oceania Championship for Women 1974
1st FIBA Oceanian Women's Basketball Championship

Tournament details
- Host country: Australia
- Dates: 10–15 October
- Teams: 2 (from 21 federations)
- Venues: 2 (in 2 host cities)

Final positions
- Champions: Australia (1st title)

The FIBA Oceania Championship for Women 1974 was the qualifying tournament of FIBA Oceania for the 1975 FIBA World Championship for Women in Colombia. The tournament, a best-of-three series between Australia and New Zealand, was held in Melbourne and Sydney. Australia won the series 3–0 to win the first Oceania Championship.

== Results ==
10 October

Australia	75–55	New Zealand
Scoring by half: 35–30, 40–25

Melbourne, Sydney

12 October

Australia	72–44	New Zealand
Scoring by half: 48–24, 24–20

Melbourne, Sydney

15 October

Australia	69–42	New Zealand
Scoring by half: 40–30, 29–12
Australia wins series 3–0

Melbourne, Sydney

1974 Oceanian champions

Australia
First title
