= Boris Sokolovsky =

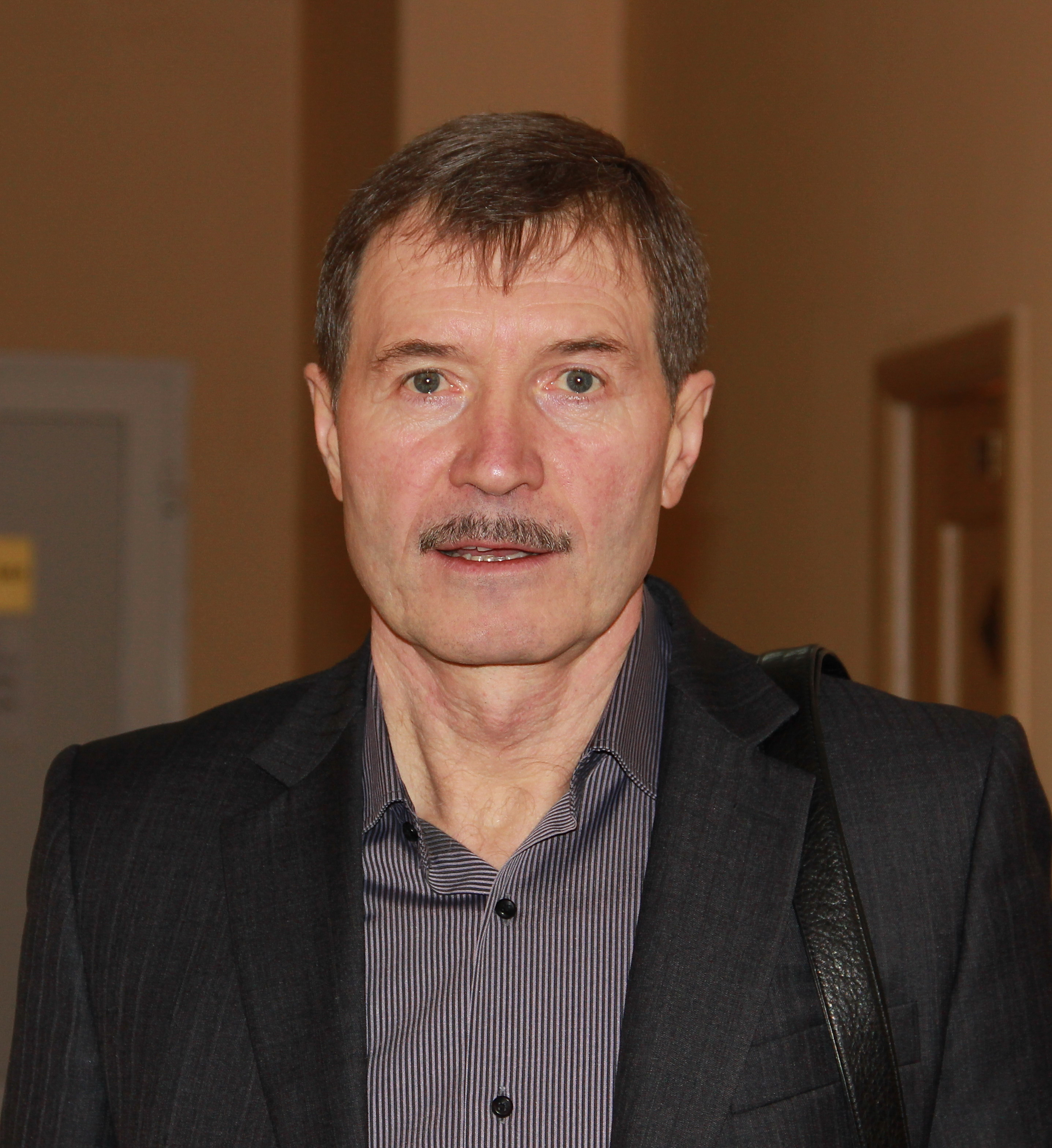
- Sokolovsky in 2012

Personal information
- Born: 9 December 1953 (age 72) Penza, Soviet Union

Sport
- Sport: Basketball
- Club: Player: Dynamo Kuibyshev (1971–73); Azov Tolyatti (1973–75); Pamir Dushanbe (1975–79); Coach: SKA Kiev (1979–81); DAAZ Ulyanovsk (1982–83); Tajikistan SSR team (1983–87); BC Donetsk (1987–90); BC Avtodor Saratov (1991–92); BC Aleskram Kiev (1992–93); BC Donetsk (1993–94); BC Kiev-Basket (1994–95); BC Avtodor Saratov (1995–96); CSK VVS Samara (1996–2002); EVRAZ Yakterinburg (2002–03); BC UNICS (2003–05); Dynamo Moscow (2005–06); Chevakata Vologda (2006–09); WBC Dynamo Novosibirsk (2009–14); BC Krasnye Krylia (2014–15); Burevestnik Yaroslavl (2015–)

Boris Ilyich Sokolovsky (Russian: Бори́с Ильи́ч Соколóвский, born 9 December 1953) is a Russian professional basketball coach and former basketball player. Since 1986, he has worked as an assistant coach, first with the Soviet, and then with the Russian men's and women's national basketball teams. In 2009, he was named the best women's basketball coach in Russia.

== Club playing career ==
Sokolovsky played basketball with several Soviet clubs, from 1971 to 1979.

== Coaching career ==
Sokolovsky started working as a coach in 1979, in Kiev, Ukraine. Between 2010 and 2012, he was the head coach of the Russian women's national basketball team.

== Personal ==
In 1983, Sokolovsky moved to Tajikistan, where he married Valentina, a national team basketball player. They have a son, Aleksei, and daughters Irina and Olga. Aleksei works as a basketball coach, while Irina and Olga are international basketball players.

== See also ==
- List of EuroBasket Women winning head coaches
