= Vince Mellars =

New Zealand rugby league footballer

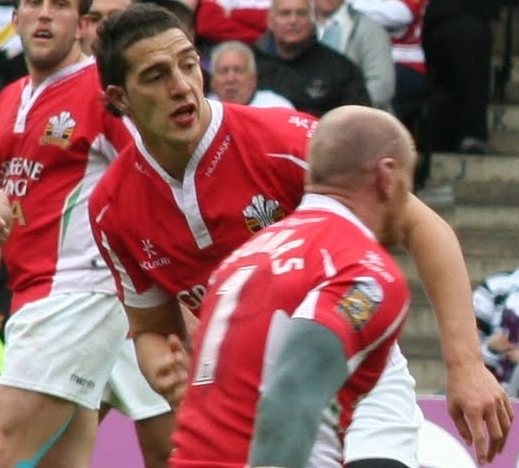

Personal information
- Full name: Vincent Mellars
- Born: 27 January 1984 (age 42) Porirua, New Zealand
- Height: 190 cm (6 ft 3 in)
- Weight: 101 kg (15 st 13 lb)

Playing information
- Position: Centre
Club
Years	Team	Pld	T	G	FG	P
2003–04	New Zealand Warriors	7	1	0	0	4
2005	Cronulla Sharks	5	2	0	0	8
2006	Sydney Roosters	12	3	0	0	12
2010–11	Crusaders RL	48	18	0	0	72
2012–13	Wakefield Trinity Wildcats	28	4	0	0	16
2013	Featherstone Rovers	11	5	0	0	20
	Total	111	33	0	0	132
- Source: As of 5 June 2025
- Education: Bishop Viard College
- Spouse: Charmian Purcell
- Father: Peter Mellars

Vincent "Vinny" Mellars (born 27 January 1984) is a New Zealand rugby league and rugby union footballer who plays in the Centres. He has previously played in the NRL, Super League and Air New Zealand Cup and in the RFL Championship for Featherstone Rovers.

== Background ==
Vinny Mellars was born in Porirua, New Zealand. His father, Peter, was a New Zealand international.

== Early career ==
Mellars played his junior rugby league for Wainuiomata and Petone.

After being signed by the New Zealand Warriors he moved to Auckland, playing for Otahuhu in the 2002 Bartercard Cup. He also represented Wainuiomata and Wellington in the Bartercard Cup.

== New Zealand ==
Mellars made his NRL début aged 19, in round 13 of the 2003 NRL season with the New Zealand Warriors against the Cronulla-Sutherland Sharks.

Mellars played with the Warriors throughout the 2003 and 2004 seasons.

== Cronulla-Sutherland ==
In 2005, Mellars signed with the Cronulla-Sutherland Sharks. Mellars scored two tries against Newcastle in 2005 including the winning try in Golden Point extra time.

== Sydney Roosters ==
In round 6 of the 2006 NRL season, Mellars featured for the Sydney Roosters when he was chosen to play against Brisbane on the Wing. Mellars scored his first try of 2006 in round 8 against North Queensland. His second try of 2006, was against Souths in round 11 and his third was against Melbourne in round 13.

In round 18, Mellars was called up for the game against Manly-Warringah (to replace Shaun Foley).

Mellars played in the 2006 NSW Cup grand final for Newtown, who were the feeder club for the Sydney Roosters at the time. Newtown would lose the final 20–19 against Parramatta at Stadium Australia.

== Rugby Union ==
In 2008, Mellars made the switch to rugby union, moving to Christchurch, New Zealand to be with his wife, Charmian Purcell, who played basketball for the Christchurch Sirens and who had also represented New Zealand at the 2008 Beijing Olympics. He was in the Crusaders wider training squad and played in the Air New Zealand Cup for Canterbury.

== Return to League ==
In 2009 Mellars played with the Auckland Vulcans in the NSW Cup.

== Super League ==
Just a few weeks before the start of the 2010 Super League season, Mellars signed for Crusaders RLFC. Only fourteen days later, he made his début in 2010's Super League XV against Leeds where he put Gareth Raynor over the line for his first try for the Crusaders.

Following the demise of the Crusaders, Mellars joined Wakefield Trinity on a three-year deal, starting in 2012.

In 2013, Vince signed a contract to play with Kingstone Press Championship club Featherstone Rovers.
