= Charmian Mellars =

New Zealand basketball player (born 1979)

Personal information
- Born: Charmian Purcell; 7 January 1979 (age 47) Papakura, Auckland, New Zealand
- Spouse: Vince Mellars
- Relatives: Natalie Purcell (sister)

Sport
- Position: Shooting guard
Medal record
Women's basketball
Representing New Zealand
Commonwealth Games
Silver medal – second place	2006 Melbourne	Team competition

Charmian Mellars (née Purcell; born 7 January 1979 in Papakura, Auckland) is a New Zealand female professional basketball player. She was a member of New Zealand women's national basketball team at the 2008 Beijing Olympics. She scored six points and grabbed two rebounds in the game they played against China, which they were defeated 80–63.

She played as a shooting guard for the Christchurch Sirens in the Women's National Basketball League (WNBL). In 2001 Mellars was named New Zealand's Most Valuable Player in the under 23-year-old category.

Mellars is a member of the Church of Jesus Christ of Latter-day Saints. She is the older sister of fellow New Zealand female professional basketball player and Latter-day Saint Natalie Taylor.
