= Irina Sokolovskaya =

Russian basketball player

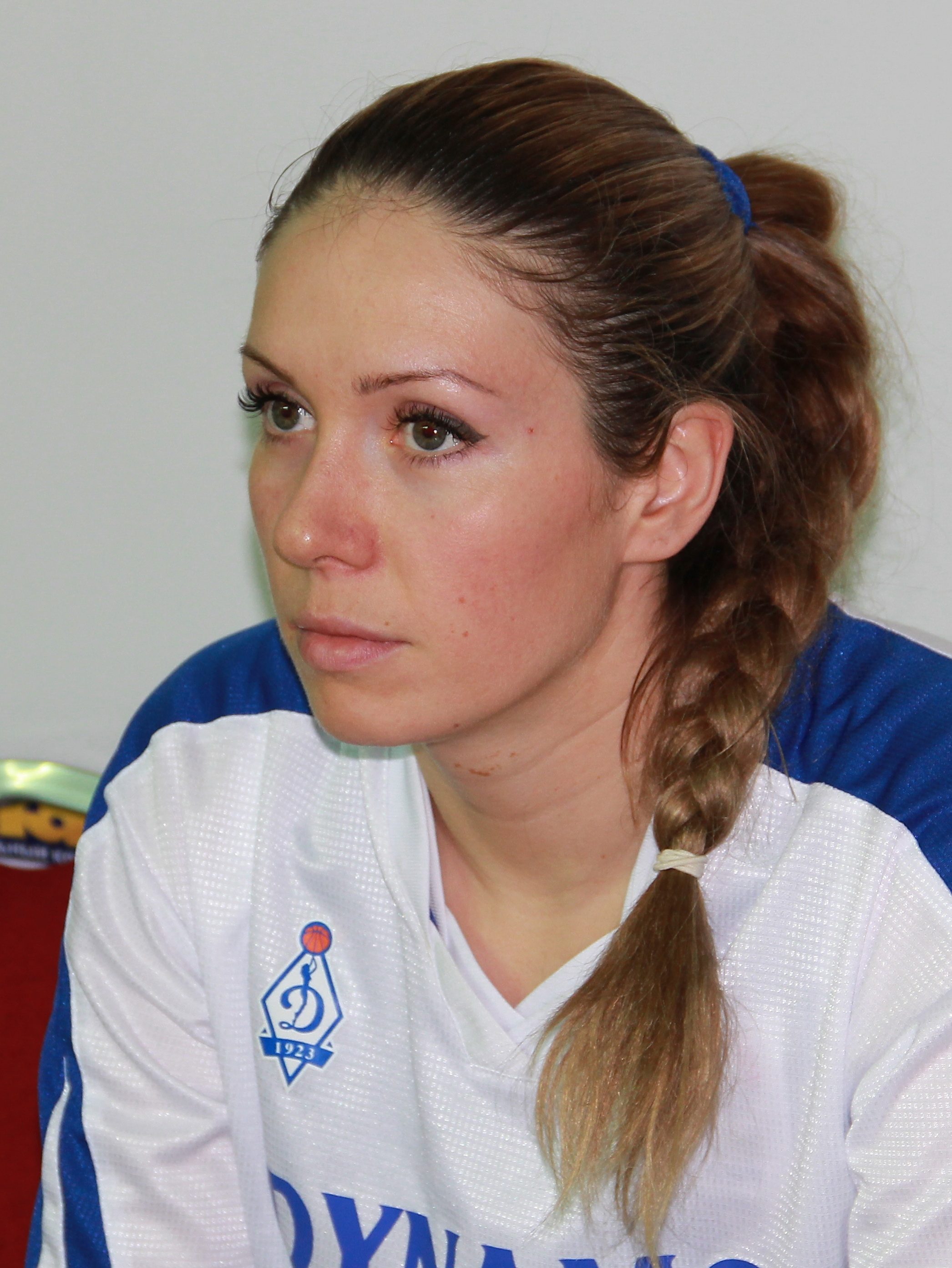
- Sokolovskaya in 2012

Personal information
- Born: 3 January 1983 (age 43) Vologda, Russia
- Height: 186 cm (6 ft 1 in)
- Weight: 72 kg (159 lb)

Sport
- Sport: Basketball
Medal record
Representing Russia
Olympic Games
| Bronze medal – third place | 2008 Beijing | Team |
European Championships
| Silver medal – second place | 2005 Turkey | Team |
| Gold medal – first place | 2007 Italy | Team |

Irina Borisovna Sokolovskaya (Russian: Ирина Борисовна Соколовская, born 3 January 1983) is a Russian basketball player. She was part of the Russian national team that won the bronze medal at the 2008 Olympics. She plays for Dynamo Moscow in the Russian Premier League.

Her younger sister Olga is also a basketball player, and her father Boris is a national basketball coach.

== Career ==
- 2000–2003 Chevakata Vologda
- 2003–2004 Dynamo Moscow
- 2004–2007 Chevakata Vologda
- 2007–2008 CSKA Moscow
- 2009–2010 Chevakata Vologda
- 2010–2011 Spartak Moscow Region
- 2011 Chevakata Vologda
- 2011– Dynamo Moscow
