= Peter Mellars =

New Zealand rugby league footballer and administrator (born 1959)

Personal information
- Full name: Peter Orewa Mellars
- Born: 4 August 1959 (age 66) New Zealand

Playing information
- Position: Prop
Club
Years	Team	Pld	T	G	FG	P
	Petone
Representative
Years	Team	Pld	T	G	FG	P
1979–1982	Wellington	45	0	0	0	0
1982	New Zealand	1	0	0	0	0
- Relatives: Vince Mellars (son)

Peter Mellars is a New Zealand former rugby league footballer and administrator who represented New Zealand. His son, Vince, is a professional rugby league player.

== Playing career ==
Mellars played for Petone and represented Wellington. In 1982 he was selected for the New Zealand national rugby league team however he did not play in any Test matches.

== Later years ==
Mellars is the chairman of the Petone Panthers club and also served as the manager of the Wellington Orcas in the final year of the Bartercard Cup.
