= 1995 FIBA Oceania Championship for Women =

FIBA Oceania Championship for Women 1995
7th FIBA Oceanian Women's Basketball Championship

Tournament details
- Host country: Australia
- Dates: June 18 – June 22
- Teams: 2 (from 21 federations)
- Venue: 1 (in 1 host city)

Final positions
- Champions: Australia (6th title)

The FIBA Oceania Championship for Women 1995 (also known as 1995 Oceania Olympic Qualification for Women) was the qualifying tournament of FIBA Oceania basketball for the 1996 Summer Olympics in Atlanta. The tournament was held in Sydney. Australia won its 6th Oceania Championship to qualify for the Olympics.

== Results ==
June 18

Australia	89–44	New Zealand

June 22

Australia	79–45	New Zealand

1995 Oceanian champions

Australia
Sixth title
