= Miloslava Svobodová =

Czech basketball player

Miloslava Svobodová (born 7 February 1984) is a Czech basketball player who competed in the 2008 Summer Olympics.
