= 1985 FIBA Oceania Championship for Women =

Oceanua Championship

FIBA Oceania Championship for Women 1985
4th FIBA Oceanian Women's Basketball Championship

Tournament details
- Host country: Australia
- Dates: 12 – 15 September
- Teams: 2 (from 21 federations)
- Venue: 1 (in 1 host city)

Final positions
- Champions: Australia (4th title)

The FIBA Oceania Championship for Women 1985 was the qualifying tournament of FIBA Oceania for the 1986 FIBA World Championship for Women. The tournament, a two-game series between Australia and New Zealand, was held in Melbourne. Australia won the series 2–0 to win its fourth consecutive Oceania Championship.

== Results ==
12 September

Australia	63–36	New Zealand

15 September

Australia	62–43	New Zealand

1985 Oceanian champions

Australia
Fourth title
