= 2003 FIBA Oceania Championship for Women =

FIBA Oceania Championship for Women 2003
10th FIBA Oceanian Women's Basketball Championship

Tournament details
- Host country: Australia
- Dates: 12–14 September
- Teams: 2 (from 21 federations)
- Venue(s): 2 (in 2 host cities)

Final positions
- Champions: Australia (9th title)

The FIBA Oceania Championship for Women 2003 was the qualifying tournament of FIBA Oceania for the 2004 Summer Olympics. The tournament, a two-game series between Australia and New Zealand, was held in Launceston, Davenport. Australia won all three games to qualify for the Oceanic spot in the Olympics.

== Results ==
12 September

New Zealand	55–69	Australia
Scoring by quarter: 18–15, 24–17, 16–10, 13–11

13 September

New Zealand	61–84	Australia
Scoring by quarter: 9–17, 11–27, 28–21, 13–19

2003 Oceanian champions

Australia
Ninth title
