= 1982 FIBA Oceania Championship for Women =

FIBA Oceania Championship for Women 1982
3rd FIBA Oceanian Women's Basketball Championship

Tournament details
- Host country: Australia
- Dates: October 21 — 24
- Teams: 2 (from 21 federations)
- Venue: 1 (in 1 host city)

Final positions
- Champions: Australia (5th title)

The FIBA Oceania Championship for Women 1982 was the qualifying tournament of FIBA Oceania for the 1983 FIBA World Championship for Women. The tournament, a best-of-three series between Australia and New Zealand, was held in Australia. Australia won the series 3–0.

== Results ==
Australia	66–46	New Zealand

Australia	64–32	New Zealand

Australia	85–55	New Zealand

1982 Oceanian champions

Australia
Third title
