= Fernanda Neves Beling =

Brazilian basketball player (born 1982)

Fernanda Neves Beling (born 5 December 1982) is a Brazilian basketball player who competed in the 2008 Summer Olympics.
