= Jin Mi-jung =

South Korean basketball player

- Hangul: 진미정
- RR: Jin Mijeong
- MR: Chin Mijŏng

Jin Mi-jung (born 28 January 1978) is a Korean basketball player who competed in the 2008 Summer Olympics.
