= 2011 FIBA Oceania Championship for Women =

2011 FIBA Oceania Championship - Women

FIBA Oceania Championship for Women 2011
14th FIBA Oceanian Women's Basketball Championship

Tournament details
- Host country: Australia
- Dates: 7–11 September
- Teams: 2 (from 21 federations)
- Venues: 3 (in 3 host cities)

Final positions
- Champions: Australia (13th title)

The 2011 FIBA Oceania Championship for Women was the 14th edition of the tournament. The tournament featured a three-game series between Australia and New Zealand. Game one was held in Melbourne at State Netball and Hockey Centre, Parkville (Capacity 3500) followed by the second game in Brisbane at Brisbane Entertainment Centre (Capacity 13500) and game three in Sydney, Australia at Sydney Entertainment Centre (Capacity 10,500) .

== Results ==
One

7 September 2011
17:15

Report

Australia	77–64	New Zealand
Scoring by quarter: 24–12, 19–14, 16–20, 18–18
Pts: Batkovic 21; Rebs: Zavecz 9 Asts: Zavecz 5		Pts: Cocks, Harmon 15; Rebs: Harmon 8 Asts: three players 3

State Netball and Hockey Centre, Melbourne
Referees: Elena Chernova, Tim Brown, Vaughan Mayberry

One

9 September 2011
17:15

Report

New Zealand	73–92	Australia
Scoring by quarter: 8–22, 27–20, 20–27, 18–23
Pts: Cocks, Taylor 17; Rebs: three players 5 Asts: McMeekan-Ruscoe 3		Pts: Batkovic 19; Rebs: Batkovic 9 Asts: Zavecz 6

Brisbane Entertainment Centre, Brisbane
Referees: Elena Chernova, Gavin Whiu, Vaughan Mayberry

One

11 September 2011
18:15

Report

Australia	82–57	New Zealand
Scoring by quarter: 17–20, 27–9, 9–15, 29–13
Pts: Bishop 21; Rebs: Penaluna 10; Asts: five players 3		Pts: Cocks 17; Rebs: Harmon 7 Asts: Taylor 4
Australia wins series 3–0

Sydney Entertainment Centre, Sydney
Referees: Elena Chernova, Vaughan Mayberry, Tim Brown

== Final rankings ==
#	Team	W–L	Qualification
1st place, gold medalist(s)	Australia	3–0	Qualified to the Olympics
2nd place, silver medalist(s)	New Zealand	0–3	Qualified to Final Olympic Qualifying Tournament
