= 1978 FIBA Oceania Championship for Women =

FIBA Oceania Championship for Women 1978
2nd FIBA Oceanian Women's Basketball Championship

Tournament details
- Host country: New Zealand
- Dates: 28–30 July
- Teams: 2 (from 21 federations)
- Venue(s): 3 (in 3 host cities)

Final positions
- Champions: Australia (2nd title)

The FIBA Oceania Championship for Women 1978 was the qualifying tournament of FIBA Oceania for the 1979 FIBA World Championship for Women. The tournament, a best-of-three series between Australia and New Zealand, was held in Auckland, Dunedin and Wellington. Australia won the series 3-0 to win its second consecutive Oceania Championship.

== Results ==
Australia	68–37	New Zealand
Scoring by half: 34-14, 34-23

Australia	63–33	New Zealand
Scoring by half: 27-14, 36-19

== Championship ==
Australia	89–32	New Zealand
Scoring by half: 36-14, 53-18
Australia wins series 3–0

1978 Oceanian champions

Australia
Second title
