= 1994 FIBA World Championship for Women =

12th FIBA World Championship for Women

Tournament details
- Host country: Australia
- Dates: 2–12 June
- Teams: 16 (from 5 federations)
- Venues: 4 (in 4 host cities)

Final positions
- Champions: Brazil (1st title)

Tournament statistics
- Top scorer: (Brazil) Marcari (27.6)
- Top rebounds: (China) Zheng (13.1)
- Top assists: (France) Souvré (6.0)
- PPG (Team): United States (99.1)
- RPG (Team): Poland (41.9)
- APG (Team): France (17.9)

The 1994 FIBA Women's World Championship was the 12th edition of the FIBA Women's World Championship, an quadrennial international tournament played by women's basketball teams in FIBA. It was hosted in Australia from 2 to 12 June 1994 at five venues with the Sydney Entertainment Centre hosting the finals.

The tournament consisted of 16 nations from five federations who competed through the regional qualifiers to get to the tournament. These teams were divided into four groups for the preliminary round. Based on the results of the Preliminary round, the teams were then resorted into groups for the quarter-final round, with the top two finishers in each Preliminary group placed into quarter-final Groups A and B, and the bottom two finishers placed into Groups C and D. Based on the placement in the quarter-final round, the teams were then sorted into groups of four, each of which played a two-round knockout draw to determine the final standings.

In the semi-finals, Brazil and China made it through to the final defeating the United States and Australia respectively. In what was the first gold medal final appearance for both teams, Brazil took out the title defeating China 96–87. The United States claimed the bronze defeating Australia 100–95.

== Venues ==
The 1994 edition saw four venues host the games. The Sydney Entertainment Centre was the main venue which hosted the second phase and the finals. The other venues hosted one of the first phase groups with the Derwent Entertainment Centre hosting Group A, Clipsal Powerhouse Group B and D with the Silverdome hosting Group C.

Adelaide	Hobart	Launceston	Sydney
Clipsal Powerhouse; Capacity: 8,000	Derwent Entertainment Centre; Capacity: 5,400	Silverdome; Capacity: 4,000	Sydney Entertainment Centre; Capacity: 12,500

== Competing nations ==
Group A	Group B	Group C	Group D
Spain	Canada	Brazil	Australia
New Zealand	Cuba	Chinese Taipei	China
South Korea	France	Poland	Italy
United States	Kenya	Slovakia	Japan

== Preliminary round ==
Qualified to the quarter-finals Groups A & B
Qualified to the quarter-finals Groups C & D

In the preliminary round, each team played games against the other three teams in its group. The top two teams in each group were then placed into Groups A and B for the quarter-final Round, while the remaining teams were placed into Groups C and D for the quarter-final Round. Teams placed into Groups A and B for the quarter-final Round were eligible for the Championship bracket, while teams placed into Groups C and D finished no higher than 9th place.

=== Group A ===
Team	Pld	W	L	PF	PA	PD	Pts
United States	3	3	0	297	182	+115	6
Spain	3	2	1	277	234	+43	5
South Korea	3	1	2	249	255	−6	4
New Zealand	3	0	3	159	311	−152	3

2 June 1994

Boxscore

Spain	117–54	New Zealand
Scoring by half: 56–29, 61–25

2 June 1994

Boxscore

United States	108–64	South Korea
Scoring by half: 49–30, 59–34

3 June 1994

Boxscore

South Korea	97–58	New Zealand
Scoring by half: 44–24, 53–34

3 June 1994

Boxscore

United States	92–71	Spain
Scoring by half: 49–35, 43–36

4 June 1994

Boxscore

New Zealand	47–97	United States
Scoring by half: 24–54, 23–43

4 June 1994

Boxscore

South Korea	88–89	Spain
Scoring by half: 32–44, 56–45

=== Group B ===
Team	Pld	W	L	PF	PA	PD	Pts
Cuba	3	3	0	283	191	+92	6
Canada	3	2	1	247	179	+68	5
France	3	1	2	231	181	+50	4
Kenya	3	0	3	129	339	−210	3

2 June 1994

Boxscore

Cuba	71–68	France
Scoring by half: 39–42, 32–26

2 June 1994

Boxscore

Kenya	34–109	Canada
Scoring by half: 20–52, 14–57

3 June 1994

Boxscore

Canada	72–90	Cuba
Scoring by half: 34–55, 38–35

3 June 1994

Boxscore

France	108–44	Kenya
Scoring by half: 55–19, 53–25

4 June 1994

Boxscore

Kenya	51–122	Cuba
Scoring by half: 26–73, 25–49

4 June 1994

Boxscore

France	55–66	Canada
Scoring by half: 34–33, 21–33

=== Group C ===
Team	Pld	W	L	PF	PA	PD	Pts
Slovakia	3	3	0	279	213	+66	6
Brazil	3	2	1	287	259	+28	5
Poland	3	1	2	231	245	−14	4
Chinese Taipei	3	0	3	220	300	−80	3

2 June 1994

Boxscore

Slovakia	94–52	Poland
Scoring by half: 47–27, 47–25

2 June 1994

Boxscore

Brazil	112–83	Chinese Taipei
Scoring by half: 64–41, 48–42

3 June 1994

Boxscore

Poland	102–64	Chinese Taipei
Scoring by half: 57–25, 45–39

3 June 1994

Boxscore

Brazil	88–99	Slovakia
Scoring by half: 50–52, 38–47

4 June 1994

Boxscore

Chinese Taipei	73–86	Slovakia
Scoring by half: 36–46, 37–40

4 June 1994

Boxscore

Brazil	87–77	Poland
Scoring by half: 48–39, 39–38

=== Group D ===
Team	Pld	W	L	PF	PA	PD	Pts
China	3	2	1	229	197	+32	5
Australia	3	2	1	200	196	+4	5
Italy	3	2	1	193	198	−5	5
Japan	3	0	3	188	219	−31	3

2 June 1994

Boxscore

Australia	60–58	Japan
Scoring by half: 32–34, 28–24

2 June 1994

Boxscore

China	60–65	Italy
Scoring by half: 35–42, 25–23

3 June 1994

Boxscore

Italy	77–65	Japan
Scoring by half: 39–27, 38–38

3 June 1994

Boxscore

Australia	67–87	China
Scoring by half: 33–40, 34–47

4 June 1994

Boxscore

Italy	51–73	Australia
Scoring by half: 24–38, 27–35

4 June 1994

Boxscore

Japan	65–82	China
Scoring by half: 37–47, 28–35

== Quarter-final Round ==
Qualified to the Championship bracket
Qualified to the 5–8 bracket
Qualified to the 9–12 bracket
Qualified to the 13–16 bracket

In the quarter-final Round, each team played games against the other three teams in its group. The top two teams in Groups A and B qualified for the Championship bracket, while the remaining teams from Groups A and B were placed in the bracket to determine places 5 through 9. The top two teams from Groups C and D were placed in the bracket to determine places 9 through 12, and the remaining teams were placed in the bracket to determine places 13 through 16.

=== Group A ===
Team	Pld	W	L	PF	PA	PD	Pts
United States	3	3	0	289	231	+58	6
Australia	3	2	1	246	237	+9	5
Slovakia	3	1	2	239	252	−13	4
Canada	3	0	3	200	254	−54	3

7 June 1994

Boxscore

United States	88–70	Australia
Scoring by half: 41–35, 47–35

7 June 1994

Boxscore

Slovakia	66–63	Canada
Scoring by half: 36–36, 30–27

8 June 1994

Boxscore

Canada	65–98	United States
Scoring by half: 29–52, 36–46

8 June 1994

Boxscore

Australia	86–77	Slovakia
Scoring by half: 39–35, 47–42

9 June 1994

Boxscore

United States	103–96	Slovakia
Scoring by half: 54–46, 49–50

9 June 1994

Boxscore

Canada	72–90	Australia
Scoring by half: 37–52, 35–38

=== Group B ===
Team	Pld	W	L	PF	PA	PD	Pts
China	3	2	1	243	250	−7	5
Brazil	3	2	1	293	275	+18	5
Cuba	3	1	2	243	262	−19	4
Spain	3	1	2	228	220	+8	4

7 June 1994

Boxscore

Cuba	91–111	Brazil
Scoring by half: 48–61, 43–50

7 June 1994

Boxscore

China	60–76	Spain
Scoring by half: 28–40, 32–36

8 June 1994

Boxscore

Spain	65–68	Cuba
Scoring by half: 40–27, 25–41

8 June 1994

Boxscore

Brazil	90–97	China
Scoring by half: 48–57, 42–40

9 June 1994

Boxscore

Cuba	84–86	China
Scoring by half: 42–42, 42–44

9 June 1994

Boxscore

Spain	87–92	Brazil
Scoring by half: 53–45, 34–47

=== Group C ===
Team	Pld	W	L	PF	PA	PD	Pts
South Korea	3	2	1	297	230	+67	5
Japan	3	2	1	292	229	+63	5
Poland	3	2	1	265	247	+18	5
Kenya	3	0	3	204	352	−148	3

7 June 1994

Boxscore

Japan	83–63	South Korea
Scoring by half: 41–31, 42–32

7 June 1994

Boxscore

Poland	94–62	Kenya
Scoring by half: 58–30, 36–32

8 June 1994

Boxscore

Kenya	76–136	South Korea
Scoring by half: 29–63, 47–73

8 June 1994

Boxscore

Japan	87–100	Poland
Scoring by half: 44–55, 43–45

9 June 1994

Boxscore

South Korea	98–71	Poland
Scoring by half: 57–50, 41–21

9 June 1994

Boxscore

Kenya	66–122	Japan
Scoring by half: 33–62, 33–60

=== Group D ===
Team	Pld	W	L	PF	PA	PD	Pts
France	3	3	0	250	197	+53	6
Italy	3	2	1	258	194	+64	5
Chinese Taipei	3	1	2	230	269	−39	4
New Zealand	3	0	3	184	262	−78	3

7 June 1994

Boxscore

France	89–68	Chinese Taipei
Scoring by half: 42–37, 47–31

7 June 1994

Boxscore

Italy	84–49	New Zealand
Scoring by half: 39–15, 45–34

8 June 1994

Boxscore

New Zealand	59–90	France
Scoring by half: 32–51, 27–39

8 June 1994

Boxscore

Chinese Taipei	74–104	Italy
Scoring by half: 41–54, 33–50

9 June 1994

Boxscore

France	71–70	Italy
Scoring by half: 32–33, 39–37

9 June 1994

Boxscore

New Zealand	76–88 (OT)	Chinese Taipei
Scoring by half: 32–28, 38–42 Overtime: 6–18

== Knockout stage ==
=== Championship bracket ===
Semi-finals
11 June – Sydney
Brazil	110
United States	107
11 June – Sydney
Australia	65
China	66

Final
12 June – Sydney
Brazil	96
China	87
Third place
12 June – Sydney
United States	100
Australia	95

=== 5th through 8th place ===
Classification round
11 June – Sydney
Slovakia	90
Spain	69
11 June – Sydney
Canada	55
Cuba	74

Fifth place
12 June – Sydney
Cuba	81
Slovakia	92
Seventh place
12 June – Sydney
Canada	70
Spain	65

=== 9th through 12th place ===
Classification round
11 June – Sydney
South Korea	89
Italy	78
11 June – Sydney
Japan	81
France	82

Ninth place
12 June – Sydney
South Korea	79
France	89
Eleventh place
12 June – Sydney
Italy	90
Japan	75

=== 13th through 16th place ===
Classification round
11 June – Sydney
Poland	79
New Zealand	70
11 June – Sydney
Kenya	80
Chinese Taipei	85

Thirteenth place
12 June – Sydney
Poland	84
Chinese Taipei	69
Fifeteenth place
12 June – Sydney
New Zealand	93
Kenya	76

== Awards ==
1994 World Championship winner

Brazil
First title

Most Valuable Player
(China) Zheng Haixia

== Final standings ==
#	Team	W-L
	Brazil	6–2
	China	5–3
	United States	7–1
4	Australia	4–4
5	Slovakia	6–2
6	Cuba	5–3
7	Canada	3–5
8	Spain	3–5
9	France	6–2
10	South Korea	4–4
11	Italy	5–3
12	Japan	2–6
13	Poland	5–3
14	Chinese Taipei	2–6
15	New Zealand	1–7
16	Kenya	0–8
