= Nonila Wharemate =

New Zealand basketball player

Medal record

Women's basketball

Representing New Zealand

Commonwealth Games
Silver medal – second place	2006 Melbourne	Team competition

Nonila "Noni" Wharemate (also known as Noni Martin; born 17 January 1982 in Hamilton, Waikato) is a member of New Zealand's women's basketball team at the Beijing Olympics in 2008. She also played on New Zealand's Commonwealth Games Women's basketball team in 2006 and on New Zealand's team at the 2004 Olympics.

Wharemate is a member of the Christchurch Sirens. She was named New Zealand's women's basketball defensive player of the year in 2001. She played college basketball at the University of Texas at El Paso.

On 12 December 2014, Wharemate signed with the Joondalup Wolves for the 2015 SBL season.

Wharemate is a member of the Church of Jesus Christ of Latter-day Saints.
