= Aneka Kerr =

New Zealand basketball player

Medal record

Women's basketball

Representing New Zealand

Commonwealth Games
Silver medal – second place	2006 Melbourne	Team competition

Aneka Kerr (born 1 March 1981 in Rangiora) is a basketball player for New Zealand. At the 2006 Commonwealth Games she won a silver medal as part of the Tall Ferns New Zealand women's basketball team. Kerr represented New Zealand and the Tall Ferns at the 2004 and 2008 Summer Olympics.

Kerr also played in the Women's National Basketball League in Australia with teams from Melbourne, Townsville, Dandenong and Christchurch.
