= Kate McMeeken-Ruscoe =

New Zealand basketball player (born 1979)

Personal information
- Born: 19 December 1979 (age 46)
Medal record
Women's basketball
Representing New Zealand
Commonwealth Games
Silver medal – second place	2006 Melbourne	Team competition

Kate Evers (Née McMeeken-Ruscoe) (born 19 December 1979 in Christchurch, New Zealand) is a basketball player for New Zealand. At the 2006 Commonwealth Games she won a silver medal as part of the Tall Ferns New Zealand women's basketball team.

She has two sons, Knox and Kaven.

Kate is a married to her wife, Kyla Evers, and they celebrated their wedding on the island of Oahu in Hawaii, United States.

She currently plays for the Townsville Fire women's basketball team.

She played college basketball in the United States at the University at Buffalo.

== Hawai'i and Buffalo statistics ==
Legend
GP	Games played	GS	Games started	MPG	Minutes per game
FG%	Field goal percentage	3P%	3-point field goal percentage	FT%	Free throw percentage
RPG	Rebounds per game	APG	Assists per game	SPG	Steals per game
BPG	Blocks per game	PPG	Points per game	**Bold**	Career high

Year	Team	GP	Points	FG%	3P%	FT%	RPG	APG	SPG	BPG	PPG
1998-99	Hawai'i	22	21	21.4%	0.1%	-	0.9	0.3	0.1	-	1.0
2001-02	Buffalo	28	342	37.6%	30.2%	73.3%	**4.5**	3.1	1.9	0.1	12.2
2002-03	Buffalo	**29**	**449**	**48.1%**	**36.9%**	**83.1%**	4.3	**3.9**	**1.9**	**0.1**	**15.5**
Career		79	812	41.9%	67.2%	253.5%	94.6	2.6	1.4	0.1	10.3
