= New Zealand women's national basketball team =

Women's national basketball team representing New Zealand

New Zealand
- FIBA ranking: 21 (18 March 2026)
- FIBA zone: FIBA Oceania
- National federation: Basketball New Zealand
- Coach: Natalie Hurst
- Nickname: Tall Ferns

Olympic Games
- Appearances: 3

World Cup
- Appearances: 1

Asia Cup
- Appearances: 5
- Medals: None

Oceania Championship
- Appearances: 15
- Medals: (gold) Gold: (1993); (silver) Silver: (1974, 1978, 1982, 1985, 1989, 1995, 1997, 2001, 2003, 2005, 2007, 2009, 2011, 2015)
Home	Away

First international
- Australia 78–42 New Zealand (Malacca, Malaysia; 6 June 1988)

Biggest win
- New Zealand 124–21 New Caledonia (Lower Hutt, New Zealand; 2 June 1997)

Biggest defeat
- Spain 117–54 New Zealand (Hobart, Australia; 2 June 1994)
Medal record
Women's basketball
Commonwealth Games
Silver medal – second place	2006 Melbourne	Team
Bronze medal – third place	2018 Gold Coast	Team
William Jones Cup
Gold medal – first place	2018 Taiwan
Silver medal – second place	2019 Taiwan

The New Zealand women's national basketball team represents New Zealand in international basketball competitions. They are nicknamed the Tall Ferns. The head coach of the team is Natalie Hurst.

The New Zealand women's national team has taken part in three Olympic Games, and one FIBA Women's World Cup. Since participating at the FIBA Women's Asia Cup in 2017, their top performance is a fourth place finish in 2023. In the past, the Tall Ferns have also competed at the FIBA Oceania Women's Championship.

== Competitive record ==
=== Olympic Games ===
Olympic Games record
Year	Round	Position	Pld	W	L
(Canada) 1976	Did not qualify				
(Soviet Union) 1980	Did not qualify				
(United States) 1984	Did not qualify				
(South Korea) 1988	Did not qualify				
(Spain) 1992	Did not qualify				
(United States) 1996	Did not qualify				
(Australia) 2000	Group stage	11th	6	1	5
(Greece) 2004	Quarter-finals	8th	7	2	5
(China) 2008	Group stage	10th	5	1	4
(United Kingdom) 2012	Did not qualify				
(Brazil) 2016	Did not qualify				
(Japan) 2020	Did not qualify				
(France) 2024	Did not qualify				
(United States) 2028	To be determined				
Total			18	4	14

=== FIBA Women's World Cup ===
FIBA Women's World Cup record
Year	Round	Position	Pld	W	L
(Chile) 1953	Did not participate				
(Brazil) 1957	Did not participate				
(Soviet Union) 1959	Did not participate				
(Peru) 1964	Did not participate				
(Czechoslovakia) 1967	Did not participate				
(Brazil) 1971	Did not participate				
(Colombia) 1975	Did not participate				
(South Korea) 1979	Did not participate				
(Brazil) 1983	Did not participate				
(Soviet Union) 1986	Did not participate				
(Malaysia) 1990	Did not participate				
(Australia) 1994	Group stage	15th	8	1	7
(Germany) 1998	Did not qualify				
(China) 2002	Did not qualify				
(Brazil) 2006	Did not qualify				
(Czech Republic) 2010	Did not qualify				
(Turkey) 2014	Did not qualify				
(Spain) 2018	Did not qualify				
(Australia) 2022	Did not qualify				
(Germany) 2026	Did not qualify				
(Japan) 2030	To be determined				
Total			8	1	7

=== FIBA Women's Asia Cup ===
FIBA Women's Asia Cup record
Year	Round	Position	Pld	W	L
(India) 2017	Quarter-finals	6th	6	3	3
(India) 2019	Play-offs round	5th	5	2	3
(Jordan) 2021	Play-offs round	5th	5	2	3
(Australia) 2023	Fourth place	4th	6	3	3
(China) 2025	Fifth place	5th	5	2	3
(Philippines) 2027	Qualified				
Total			27	12	15

== Team ==
=== Current roster ===
Roster for the 2025 FIBA Women's Asia Cup.

New Zealand women's national basketball team roster
Players
Coaches

Pos.	No.	Name	Age – Date of birth	Height	Club	Ctr.
SF	2	Emilia Shearer	23 – 22 January 2002	1.78 m (5 ft 10 in)	Mackay Basketball	(Australia)
G	3	Bailey Flavell	18 – 15 February 2007	1.78 m (5 ft 10 in)	Hawaii Rainbow Wahine	(United States)
PG	4	Pahlyss Hokianga	17 – 9 October 2007	1.66 m (5 ft 5 in)	Tokomanawa Queens	(New Zealand)
F	8	Rebecca Pizzey	26 – 27 January 1999	1.91 m (6 ft 3 in)	Eltham Wildcats	(Australia)
SF	10	Ashlee Strawbridge	23 – 25 January 2002	1.78 m (5 ft 10 in)	West Adelaide Bearcats	(Australia)
F	13	Esra McGoldrick	25 – 24 October 1999	1.87 m (6 ft 2 in)	Casey Cavaliers	(Australia)
PF	14	Ella Tofaeono	27 – 11 March 1998	1.80 m (5 ft 11 in)	Melbourne Tigers	(Australia)
C	15	Ritorya Tamilo	20 – 15 June 2005	1.92 m (6 ft 4 in)	Hawaii Rainbow Wahine	(United States)
SG	22	Olivia Williams	22 – 26 January 2003	1.86 m (6 ft 1 in)	San Francisco Dons	(United States)
G	26	Tayla Dalton	23 – 1 October 2001	1.74 m (5 ft 9 in)	Townsville Fire	(Australia)
G	44	McKenna Dale	26 – 16 June 1999	1.81 m (5 ft 11 in)	Mandurah Magic	(Australia)
PF	45	Charlotte Whittaker	24 – 12 August 2000	1.90 m (6 ft 3 in)	Toulouse Métropole Basket	(France)

Head coach

- (Australia) Natalie Hurst

Assistant coach(es)

- (Australia) Kerryn Mitchell

Legend

- (C) Team captain
- Club – describes last
  club before the tournament
- Age – describes age
  on 13 July 2025

=== Notable past players ===
- Lisa Wallbutton, (2008 Olympic Games, 2006 Commonwealth Games)
- Leanne Walker, (1994 World Championship and 2000 & 2004 Olympic Games)
- Gina Farmer, (1994 World Championship and 2000 & 2004 Olympic Games)
- Tania Tupu, (1994 World Championship and 2000 & 2004 Olympic Games)
- Kirstin Daly-Taylor, (1994 World Championship and 2000 Olympic Games)
- Leone Patterson, (1994 World Championship and 2000 Olympic Games)
- Rebecca Cotton, (2000 & 2004 Olympic Games and 2006 Commonwealth Games)
- Donna Loffhagen, (2000 & 2004 Olympic Games and 2006 Commonwealth Games)
- Julie Ofsoski, (2000 & 2004 Olympic Games)
- Megan Compain, (2000 & 2004 Olympic Games)
- Sally Farmer, (2000 & 2004 Olympic Games)
- Aneka Kerr, (2004 & 2008 Olympic Games and 2006 Commonwealth Games)
- Angela Marino, (2004 & 2008 Olympic Games)

=== Netball and Basketball ===
The following New Zealand basketball internationals also played for the New Zealand national netball team.

Player	Netball Apps	Years	Basketball Apps	Years
Sheryl Burns	8	1992–1993		1985–1991, 1995
Belinda Colling	92	1996–2006	48	2000
Lynne Macdonald	2	1969	10	
Lois Muir	13	1960–1964	17	1952–1962
Jessica Tuki	3	2006		2014
Donna Wilkins	56	1996–2002	95	2000–2006
Maia Wilson	52	2016–	6	2014
Parris Mason	5	2024–	8	2022-2023
