= Lisa Wallbutton =

New Zealand basketball player

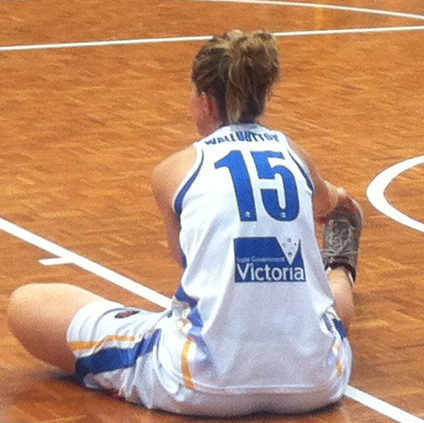

Personal information
- Born: 14 January 1986 (age 40) Auckland, New Zealand
- Listed height: 183 cm (6 ft 0 in)

Career information
- Playing career: 2002–2021
- Position: Forward
Medals
Women's basketball
Representing New Zealand
Commonwealth Games
Silver medal – second place	2006 Melbourne	Team competition

Lisa Wallbutton (born 14 January 1986) is a New Zealand former basketball player.

== Early life ==
Wallbutton was born in Auckland, New Zealand.

== Basketball career ==
Wallbutton played for Harbour in the New Zealand NBL in 2002, 2004 and 2005. She was named Outstanding Young Player in the 2004 and 2005 seasons, and was a member of the All-Star Five in 2005.

Wallbutton debuted in the Women's National Basketball League (WNBL) in Australia in 2007–08 with the Christchurch Sirens.

=== National team ===
Wallbutton debuted for the New Zealand national team, the Tall Ferns, in 2005. She won a silver medal at the 2006 Commonwealth Games. She represented New Zealand at the 2008 Beijing Olympics.
