= 2010 FIBA World Championship for Women squads =

The following is the list of squads for each of the 24 teams competing in the 2010 FIBA World Championship for Women, held in the Czech Republic between September 23 and October 3, 2010. Each team selected a squad of 12 players for the tournament.

== Group A ==
=== Australia ===
Head coach: (Australia) Carrie Graf

#	Pos	Name	Date of Birth	Height	Club
4	G/F	Jenna O'Hea	June 6, 1987 (aged 23)	6'2" (187)	(Australia) Bulleen Boomers
5	G	Tully Bevilaqua	July 19, 1972 (aged 38)	5'5" (164)	(United States) Indiana Fever
6	C	Abby Bishop	November 29, 1988 (aged 21)	6'2" (188)	(Australia) Dandenong Rangers
7	F	Penny Taylor	May 24, 1981 (aged 29)	6'1" (185)	(United States) Phoenix Mercury
8	G	Samantha Richards	February 24, 1983 (aged 27)	5'6" (168)	(Poland) AZS PWSZ Gorzów Wielkopolski
9	C	Hollie Grima	December 16, 1983 (aged 26)	6'2" (189)	(France) ASPTT Aix-en-Provence
10	PG	Kristi Harrower	March 4, 1975 (aged 35)	5'4" (162)	(Australia) Bendigo Spirit
11	C	Marianna Tolo	July 2, 1989 (aged 21)	6'5" (196)	(Australia) Canberra Capitals
12	F	Belinda Snell	January 10, 1981 (aged 29)	5'11" (180)	(Spain) Perfumerías Avenida Baloncesto
13	G	Erin Phillips	May 19, 1985 (aged 25)	5'8" (173)	(Poland) TS Wisła Can-Pack Kraków
14	C	Elizabeth Cambage	August 19, 1991 (aged 19)	6'8" (203)	(Australia) Bulleen Boomers
15	F/C	Lauren Jackson	May 11, 1981 (aged 29)	6'5" (195)	(United States) Seattle Storm

=== Belarus ===
Head coach: (Belarus) Anatoly Buyalski

#	Pos	Name	Date of Birth	Height	Club
4	G	Sviatlana Valko	July 12, 1989 (aged 21)	5'9" (175)
5	G	Aliaksandra Tarasava	June 23, 1988 (aged 22)	5'7" (170)	(Belarus) BK Minsk-2006
6	G	Tatsiana Likhtarovich	March 29, 1988 (aged 22)	5'9" (176)	(Bulgaria) Lukoil Neftohimik
7	F	Yuliya Dureika	September 8, 1986 (aged 24)	5'10" (179)	(Poland)
8	C	Viktoryia Hasper	January 9, 1988 (aged 22)	6'4" (193)	(Russia) Vologda-Chevakata
9	G	Natallia Anufryienka	June 11, 1985 (aged 25)	5'9" (174)	(Bulgaria) Dunav Econt Rousse
10	C	Anastasiya Verameyenka	July 10, 1987 (aged 23)	6'4" (192)	(Russia) Nadezhda Orenburg
11	C	Yelena Leuchanka	April 30, 1983 (aged 27)	6'5" (196)	(Russia) UMMC Ekaterinburg
12	G	Natallia Marchanka	May 19, 1979 (aged 31)	5'7" (170)	(Russia) Dinamo-Energiya Novosibirsk
13	F	Tatyana Troina	June 30, 1981 (aged 29)	6'2" (188)	(Israel) Maccabi Ramat Hen
14	PF	Nataliya Trafimava	June 16, 1979 (aged 31)	6'1" (186)	(Poland) TS Wisła Can-Pack Kraków
15	C	Marina Kress	August 23, 1980 (aged 30)	6'4" (192)	(Spain) Extrugasa

=== Canada ===
Head coach: (Canada) Allison McNeill

#	Pos	Name	Date of Birth	Height	Club
4	C	Krista Phillips	May 18, 1988 (aged 22)	6'5" (196)	(United States) University of Michigan
5	G	Teresa Gabriele	November 23, 1979 (aged 30)	5'5" (165)	(Austria)
6	G	Kaela Chapdelaine	November 10, 1985 (aged 24)	5'10" (178)	(Slovakia) MBK Ružomberok
7	G	Courtnay Pilypaitis	February 11, 1988 (aged 22))		(United States) University of Vermont
8	F	Kimberley Smith	May 7, 1984 (aged 26)	6'2" (187)	(Spain) CB Puig d'en Valls
9	F	Janelle Bekkering	October 7, 1988 (aged 21)	6'1" (186)	(United States) Gonzaga University
10	G	Megan Pinske	October 14, 1986 (aged 23)	5'11" (180)	None
11	F	Natalie Achonwa	November 22, 1992 (aged 17)	6'2" (189)	(United States) University of Notre Dame
12	F	Lizanna Murphy	March 15, 1984 (aged 26)	6'1" (185)	(Slovakia) MBK Ružomberok
13	F	Tamara Tatham	August 19, 1985 (aged 25)	6'2" (187)	(Germany) TSV Wasserburg
14	F	Chelsea Aubry	June 27, 1984 (aged 26)	6'2" (189)	(Australia) Bendigo Spirit
15	C	Jordan Adams	May 24, 1981 (aged 29)	6'2" (189)	(United States) Birmingham Power

=== China ===
Head coach: (Australia) Tom Maher

#	Pos	Name	Date of Birth	Height	Club
4	G	Yang Banban	April 26, 1989 (aged 21)	5'7" (170)	(China) Liaoning Baocheng
5	G	Zhang Hanlan	July 19, 1979 (aged 31)	5'9" (175)	(China) Shenyang Army Golden Lions
6	G	Chen Xiaojia	April 2, 1988 (aged 22)		(China) Jiangsu Phoenix
7	F	Song Liwei	August 16, 1985 (aged 25)	6'3" (190)	(China) Shenyang Army Golden Lions
8	F	Miao Lijie	June 3, 1981 (aged 29)	5'10" (178)	(China) Shenyang Army Golden Lions
9	C	Guan Xin	January 24, 1987 (aged 23)	6'5" (196)	(China) Guangdong Dolphins
10	F	Zhang Fan	August 22, 1984 (aged 26)	6'1" (186)	(China) Beijing Great Wall
11	F	Ma Zengyu	May 7, 1983 (aged 27)		(China) Liaoning Baocheng
12	F	Chen Xiaoli	February 20, 1982 (aged 28)	6'4" (193)	(China) Liaoning Baocheng
13	C	Huang Hongpin	April 23, 1989 (aged 21)	6'5" (196)	(China) Guangdong Dolphins
14	F	Liu Dan	April 24, 1987 (aged 23)	6'4" (194)	(China) Shenyang Army Golden Lions
15	C	Chen Nan	August 1, 1983 (aged 27)	6'5" (195)	(China) Bayi Kylin

== Group B ==
=== France ===
Head coach: (France) Pierre Vincent

#	Pos	Name	Date of Birth	Height	Club
4	G	Anaël Lardy	October 24, 1987 (aged 22)	5'7" (170)	(France) CJM Bourges Basket
5	C	Endéné Miyem	May 15, 1988 (aged 22)	6'2" (188)	(France) CJM Bourges Basket
6	G	Florence Lepron	January 16, 1985 (aged 25)	6'0" (182)	(France) Tarbes Gespe Bigorre
7	C	Marielle Amant	December 9, 1989 (aged 20)	6'3" (190)	(France) ASPTT Arras
8	SG	Clémence Beikes	October 19, 1983 (aged 26)	5'10" (178)	(France) Union Hainaut Basket
9	G	Céline Dumerc	July 9, 1982 (aged 28)	5'7" (169)	(Russia) UMMC Ekaterinburg
10	F	Jennifer Digbeu	April 14, 1987 (aged 23)	6'3" (190)	(France) CJM Bourges Basket
11	SG	Émilie Gomis	October 18, 1983 (aged 26)	5'11" (180)	(France) Villeneuve d'Ascq
12	SG	Marion Laborde	December 9, 1986 (aged 23)	5'10" (178)	(France) Basket Landes
13	C	Élodie Godin	July 5, 1985 (aged 25)	6'3" (190)	(Italy) Taranto Cras Basket
14	C	Emmeline Ndongue	April 25, 1983 (aged 27)	6'4" (194)	(France) CJM Bourges Basket
15	F	Pauline Jannault	January 13, 1987 (aged 23)	6'4" (192)	(France) Tarbes Gespe Bigorre

=== Greece ===
Head coach: (Greece) Kostas Missas

#	Pos	Name	Date of Birth	Height	Club
4	PG	Dimitra Kalentzou	January 3, 1978 (aged 32)	5'9" (174)	(Greece) Athinaikos Athens
5	C	Artemis Spanou	January 1, 1993 (aged 17)	6'3" (190)	(Greece) Panionios
6	SF	Zoi Dimitrakou	May 25, 1987 (aged 23)	6'2" (188)	(France) ASPTT Aix-en-Provence
7	SG	Olga Chatzinikolaou	July 4, 1981 (aged 29)	6'0" (182)	(Greece) Athinaikos Athens
8	SF	Styliani Kaltsidou	January 12, 1983 (aged 27)	6'2" (188)	(France) CJM Bourges Basket
9	SG	Evanthia Maltsi	December 30, 1978 (aged 31)	5'11" (180)	(Czech Republic) ZVVZ USK Praha
10	C	Pelagia Papamichail	April 29, 1986 (aged 24)	6'2" (189)	(France) ASPTT Côte d'Opale
11	PG	Iouliti Lymoura	March 10, 1985 (aged 25)	5'11" (180)	(Greece) Athinaikos Athens
12	SF	Katerina Sotiriou	January 3, 1984 (aged 26)	6'1" (185)	(Greece) Ravenna Esperides
13	SG	Nafsika Stavridou	August 12, 1986 (aged 24)	5'11" (180)	(Greece) PAOK
14	C	Nikole Soulis	May 17, 1985 (aged 25)	6'3" (190)	(Greece) Athinaikos Athens
15	C	Eirini Mitropoulou	June 23, 1975 (aged 35)	6'2" (187)	(Greece) FEA

=== Senegal ===
Head coach: (Senegal) Diop Magette

#	Pos	Name	Date of Birth	Height	Club
4	SG	Nene Diame	April 2, 1986 (aged 24)	5'7" (170)	(France) Ploms
5	G	Aya Traore	July 27, 1983 (aged 27)	6'2" (188)	(Poland) PZU Polfa Pabianice
6	F	Awa Gueye	August 31, 1978 (aged 32)	6'0" (182)	(France) Limoges ABC
7	PG	Fatou Dieng	August 18, 1983 (aged 27)	5'6" (168)	(France) Perpignan
8	F	Diodio Diouf	December 15, 1984 (aged 25)	5'9" (174)	(Senegal) Esperance
9	PF	Salimata Diatta	April 14, 1981 (aged 29)	6'0" (184)	(Romania) BC Icim Arad
10	PF	Astou Traoré	April 30, 1981 (aged 29)	6'1" (186)	(Spain) Girona
11	SG	Oumoul Sarr	January 25, 1984 (aged 26)	6'3" (190)	(Spain) San Sebastian
12	PF	Marie Sy	March 25, 1985 (aged 25)	6'2" (188)	(France) Nantes
13	C	Jeanne Senghor	September 26, 1982 (aged 27)	6'4" (194)	(France) Nice
14	C	Animata Diop	January 3, 1983 (aged 27)	6'5" (196)	(Senegal) Esperance
15	PF/C	Bineta Diouf	December 15, 1984 (aged 25)	6'1" (186)	(Senegal) Esperance

=== United States ===
Head coach: (United States) Geno Auriemma

#	Pos	Name	Date of Birth	Height	Club
4	PG	Lindsay Whalen	May 9, 1982 (aged 28)	5'9" (175)	(United States) Minnesota Lynx
5	F	Asjha Jones	August 1, 1980 (aged 30)	6'2" (188)	(United States) Connecticut Sun
6	PG	Sue Bird	October 16, 1980 (aged 29)	5'9" (175)	(United States) Seattle Storm
7	PF	Candice Dupree	August 16, 1984 (aged 26)	6'2" (188)	(United States) Phoenix Mercury
8	SG	Angel McCoughtry	September 10, 1986 (aged 24)	6'1" (185)	(United States) Atlanta Dream
9	C	Jayne Appel	May 14, 1988 (aged 22)	6'4" (193)	(United States) San Antonio Silver Stars
10	SF	Tamika Catchings	July 21, 1979 (aged 31)	6'2" (188)	(United States) Indiana Fever
11	F	Swin Cash	September 22, 1979 (aged 31)	6'1" (185)	(United States) Seattle Storm
12	SG	Diana Taurasi	June 11, 1982 (aged 28)	6'0" (183)	(United States) Phoenix Mercury
13	C	Sylvia Fowles	October 6, 1985 (aged 24)	6'5" (196)	(United States) Chicago Sky
14	SG	Maya Moore	June 11, 1989 (aged 21)	6'0" (183)	(United States) University of Connecticut
15	C	Tina Charles	December 5, 1988 (aged 21)	6'4" (193)	(United States) Connecticut Sun

== Group C ==
=== Brazil ===
Head coach: (Spain) Carlos Colinas

#	Pos	Name	Date of Birth	Height	Club
4	G	Adriana Moisés Pinto	December 6, 1978 (aged 31)	5'7" (170)	(Italy) Club Atletico Faenza
5	G/F	Helen Luz	November 23, 1972 (aged 37)	5'9" (176)	(Brazil) Unimed/Americana
6	F	Karen Gustavo	March 4, 1984 (aged 26)	6'0" (183)	(Brazil) Catanduva
7	C	Franciele Nascimento	October 19, 1987 (aged 22)	6'6" (197)	(Spain) Sedis Bàsquet
8	G/F	Iziane Castro Marques	March 13, 1982 (aged 28)	5'11" (180)	(United States) Atlanta Dream
9	C	Damiris Do Amaral	November 17, 1992 (aged 17)	6'4" (192)	(Brazil) Divino/COC/Jundiaí
10	G/F	Silvia Gustavo	May 14, 1982 (aged 28)	6'0" (183)	(Brazil) Catanduva
11	G/F	Fernanda Beling	December 5, 1982 (aged 27)	6'1" (186)	(Brazil) Ourinhos
12	G/F	Palmira Marcal	May 20, 1984 (aged 26)	5'8" (173)	(Brazil) Catanduva
13	C	Alessandra Oliveira	December 2, 1973 (aged 36)	6'7" (200)	(Turkey) Botaş Spor
14	C	Erika de Souza	March 9, 1982 (aged 28)	6'6" (196)	(United States) Atlanta Dream
15	C	Kelly Santos	November 10, 1979 (aged 30)	6'4" (192)	(Turkey) Beşiktaş

=== South Korea ===
Head coach: (South Korea) Jung Duk-hwa

#	Pos	Name	Date of Birth	Height	Club
4	F	Kim Bo-mi	March 6, 1986 (aged 24)	5'9" (176)	(South Korea) Kdblife Winnus
5	G	Kim Ji-yoon	February 7, 1976 (aged 34)	5'7" (169)	(South Korea) Shinsegae Coolcat
6	C	Jung Sun-hwa	August 2, 1985 (aged 25)	6'1" (186)	(South Korea) Woori Bank Hansae
7	G	Lee Mi-sun	February 19, 1978 (aged 32)	5'9" (174)	(South Korea) Samsunglife Bichumi
8	G	Lim Yung-hui	May 29, 1980 (aged 30)	5'10" (178)	(South Korea) Woori Bank Hansae
9	PF	Jung Sun-min	October 12, 1974 (aged 35)	6'1" (185)	(South Korea) Shinhan Bank S-Birds
10	F	Beon Yeon-ha	March 7, 1980 (aged 30)	5'11" (180)	(South Korea) KB Savers
11	G/F	Park Jung-eun	January 14, 1977 (aged 33)	5'11" (180)	(South Korea) Samsunglife Bichumi
12	C	Kang Young-suk	September 16, 1981 (aged 29)	6'1" (186)	(South Korea) Shinhan Bank S-Birds
13	F	Kim Dan-bi	February 27, 1990 (aged 20)	5'11" (180)	(South Korea) Shinhan Bank S-Birds
14	C	Kim Kwe-ryong	December 17, 1979 (aged 30)	6'4" (192)	(South Korea) Shinsegae Coolcat
15	C	Sin Jung-ja	December 11, 1980 (aged 29)	6'1" (185)	(South Korea) Kdblife Winnus

=== Mali ===
Head coach: (France) Jose Ruiz

#	Pos	Name	Date of Birth	Height	Club
4	PG	Kadia Touré	January 18, 1983 (aged 27)	5'11" (180)	(Algeria) Asptt Alger
5	PG	Aissata Maiga	March 21, 1992 (aged 18)	5'6" (168)	(Mali) Djoliba AC
6	F	Nassira Traore	October 28, 1988 (aged 21)	6'1" (186)	(Senegal) Dakar UC
7	PG	Fatoumata Bagayoko	May 23, 1988 (aged 22)	5'7" (170)	(Senegal) Dakar UC
8	PG	Diana Gandega	June 2, 1983 (aged 27)	5'6" (168)	(France) Franconville
9	F/C	Hamchétou Maïga-Ba	April 25, 1978 (aged 32)	6'0" (184)	(France) Tarbes Gespe Bigorre
10	C	Naîgnouma Coulibaly	May 31, 1989 (aged 21)	6'4" (192)	(France) Pleyber-Christ Basket Club
11	C	Djene Diawara	January 29, 1985 (aged 25)	6'4" (192)	(France) Charleville-Mézières
12	C	Astan Dabo	March 30, 1992 (aged 18)	6'8" (203)	(France) Saint-Jacques Sports Reims
13	F	Meiya Tirera	April 15, 1986 (aged 24)	6'2" (187)	(Tunisia) ES Cal-Bon
14	PF	Ramata Diakite	September 17, 1991 (aged 19)	6'2" (188)	(France) Pleyber-Christ Basket Club
15	PF	Djénébou Sissoko	June 27, 1982 (aged 28)	6'0" (184)	(Poland) MKS Pruszkow

=== Spain ===
Head coach: (Spain) José Ignacio Hernández

#	Pos	Name	Date of Birth	Height	Club
4	PF	Laura Nicholls	February 26, 1989 (aged 21)	6'2" (189)	(Spain) Rivas Ecópolis
5	G	Marta Fernández	December 21, 1981 (aged 28)	5'10" (178)	(Poland) TS Wisła Can-Pack Kraków
6	PF	Sancho Lyttle	September 20, 1983 (aged 27)	6'4" (193)	(Spain) Perfumerías Avenida Baloncesto
7	C	Cindy Lima	June 21, 1981 (aged 29)	6'5" (196)	(Spain) Ros Casares Valencia
8	C	Lucila Pascua	March 21, 1983 (aged 27)	6'5" (196)	(Spain) Basket Zaragoza
9	SG	Laia Palau	September 10, 1979 (aged 31)	5'9" (176)	(Spain) Ros Casares Valencia
10	PG	Elisa Aguilar	October 15, 1976 (aged 33)	5'8" (172)	(Spain) Ros Casares Valencia
11	PG	Núria Martínez	February 29, 1984 (aged 26)	5'9" (174)	(Spain) Ros Casares Valencia
12	PF	Anna Montañana	October 24, 1980 (aged 29)	6'1" (186)	(Spain) Perfumerías Avenida Baloncesto
13	F	Amaya Valdemoro	August 18, 1976 (aged 34)	6'0" (182)	(Spain) Rivas Ecópolis
14	G	Anna Cruz	October 27, 1986 (aged 23)	5'10" (177)	(Spain) Rivas Ecópolis
15	SF	Alba Torrens	August 30, 1989 (aged 21)	6'1" (185)	(Spain) Perfumerías Avenida Baloncesto

== Group D ==
=== Argentina ===
Head coach: (Argentina) Eduardo Pinto

#	Pos	Name	Date of Birth	Height	Club
4	PG	Déborah González	January 10, 1990 (aged 20)	5'9" (176)	(Italy) Calabra Maceri Rende
5	C	Agostina Burani	October 4, 1991 (aged 18)	6'1" (185)	(Argentina) Lanús
6	SG	Paula Reggiardo	August 31, 1984 (aged 26)	5'10" (178)	(Argentina) Vélez Sársfield
7	C	Alejandra Chesta	March 19, 1982 (aged 28)	6'1" (186)	(Italy) N. P. Battipaglia
8	F	Noelia Mendoza	April 26, 1979 (aged 31)	5'10" (178)	(Argentina) Unión y Recreo
9	SG	Marina Cava	October 24, 1985 (aged 24)	5'6" (168)	(Argentina) Vélez Sársfield
10	SF	Paula Gatti	September 1, 1978 (aged 32)	5'8" (172)	(Argentina) Vélez Sársfield
11	PG	Marcela Paoletta	January 18, 1979 (aged 31)	5'5" (166)	(Argentina) Unión Florida
12	PG	Sandra Pavón	January 6, 1985 (aged 25)	5'7" (171)	(Argentina) Vélez Sársfield
13	PF	Melisa Cejas	October 26, 1984 (aged 25)	6'1" (186)	(Argentina) Unión y Recreo
14	PF	Carolina Sánchez	January 5, 1976 (aged 34)	6'1" (186)	(Spain) GDKO-Ibaizabal
15	C	Florencia Fernández	April 16, 1986 (aged 24)	6'2" (187)	(Argentina) Vélez Sársfield

=== Czech Republic ===
Head coach: (Czech Republic) Lubor Blažek

#	Pos	Name	Date of Birth	Height	Club
4	F	Jana Veselá	December 31, 1983 (aged 26)	6'4" (194)	(Spain) Ros Casares Valencia
5	C	Ivana Večeřová	March 30, 1979 (aged 31)	6'4" (194)	(Turkey) Galatasaray
6	G	Veronika Bortelová	June 11, 1978 (aged 32)	5'7" (169)	(Poland) CCC Aquapark Polkowice
7	PF	Edita Šujanová	May 23, 1985 (aged 25)	6'2" (188)	(Slovakia) Bonas UFK Nitra
8	C	Ilona Burgrová	March 15, 1984 (aged 26)	6'5" (195)	(France) Bourges Basket
9	SG	Hana Horáková	September 11, 1979 (aged 31)	5'10" (179)	(Czech Republic) Frisco SIKA Brno
10	F	Michaela Ferančíková	November 27, 1977 (aged 32)	6'3" (190)	(Czech Republic) ZVVZ USK Praha
11	SG	Kateřina Elhotová	October 14, 1989 (aged 20)	5'11" (180)	(Czech Republic) ZVVZ USK Praha
12	G	Markéta Bednářová	April 17, 1981 (aged 29)	5'10" (177)	(Czech Republic) ZVVZ USK Praha
13	C	Petra Kulichová	September 13, 1984 (aged 26)	6'6" (197)	(Czech Republic) Frisco SIKA Brno
14	F	Tereza Pecková	June 10, 1987 (aged 23)	6'2" (187)	(Czech Republic) ZVVZ USK Praha
15	F	Eva Vítečková	January 26, 1982 (aged 28)	6'3" (190)	(Czech Republic) Frisco SIKA Brno

=== Japan ===
Head coach: (Japan) Tomohide Uchiumi

#	Pos	Name	Date of Birth	Height	Club
4	SF	Yoko Nagi	May 9, 1982 (aged 28)	5'9" (175)	(Japan) Fujitsu Redwave
5	C	Maki Takada	August 23, 1989 (aged 21)	6'0" (183)	(Japan) Denso Iris
7	PF	Al Mitani	August 21, 1978 (aged 32)	6'0" (182)	(Japan) Fujitsu Redwave
8	SF	Ayumi Suzuki	October 14, 1985 (aged 24)	5'11" (180)	(Japan) Fujitsu Redwave
9	C	Hiromi Suwa	December 5, 1985 (aged 24)	6'0" (183)	(Japan) JX Sunflowers
10	SF	Saori Fujiyoshi	April 29, 1987 (aged 23)	5'10" (178)	(Japan) Chanson V-Magic
11	SG	Yoshie Sakurada	June 5, 1984 (aged 26)	5'5" (165)	(Japan) Toyota Antelopes
12	PG	Asami Yoshida	October 9, 1987 (aged 22)	5'7" (170)	(Japan) JX Sunflowers
13	PG	Yuko Oga	October 17, 1982 (aged 27)	5'7" (170)	(Japan) JX Sunflowers
14	SF	Reika Takahashi	April 14, 1988 (aged 22)	5'10" (177)	(Japan) JAL Rabbits
15	SF	Sachiko Ishikawa	August 18, 1978 (aged 32)	5'7" (170)	(Japan)

=== Russia ===
Head coach: (Russia) Igor Grudin

#	Pos	Name	Date of Birth	Height	Club
4	F	Olga Arteshina	November 27, 1982 (aged 27)	6'3" (191)	(Russia) UMMC Ekaterinburg
5	F	Natalia Zhedik	July 11, 1988 (aged 22)	6'0" (182)	(Russia) BC Spartak Saint Petersburg
6	PG	Elena Danilochkina	January 27, 1986 (aged 24)	6'0" (183)	(Russia) Nadezhda Orenburg
7	PF	Marina Kuzina	July 19, 1985 (aged 25)	6'5" (195)	(Russia) Dynamo Moscow
8	PG	Becky Hammon	March 11, 1977 (aged 33)	5'9" (175)	(Russia) Nadezhda Orenburg
9	C	Natalia Vieru	July 25, 1989 (aged 21)	6'6" (198)	(Russia) WBC Spartak Moscow Region
10	G	Ilona Korstin	May 30, 1980 (aged 30)	6'0" (182)	(Russia) WBC Spartak Moscow Region
11	C	Maria Stepanova	February 23, 1979 (aged 31)	6'8" (202)	(Russia) UMMC Ekaterinburg
12	C	Irina Osipova	June 25, 1981 (aged 29)	6'5" (196)	(Russia) WBC Spartak Moscow Region
13	G/F	Irina Sokolovskaya	January 3, 1983 (aged 27)	6'1" (186)	(Russia) Chevakata Vologda
14	F	Svetlana Abrosimova	July 9, 1980 (aged 30)	6'2" (188)	(Russia) UMMC Ekaterinburg
15	C	Tatiana Vidmer	January 8, 1986 (aged 24)	6'3" (191)	(Russia) UMMC Ekaterinburg

== See also ==
- 2010 Wheelchair Basketball World Championship squads
