= 2010 FIBA World Championship for Women =

Mistrovství světa v basketbalu žen 2010

Tournament details
- Host country: Czech Republic
- Cities: Ostrava; Brno; Karlovy Vary
- Dates: September 23 – October 3
- Teams: 16 (from 5 confederations)
- Venues: 3 (in 3 host cities)

Final positions
- Champions: United States (8th title)
- Runners-up: Czech Republic
- Third place: Spain
- Fourth place: Belarus

Tournament statistics
- MVP: (Czech Republic) Hana Horáková
- Top scorer: (Japan) Yuko Oga (19.1 points per game)

The 2010 FIBA World Championship for Women, the 16th edition of the FIBA Women's World Championship, was held from September 23 to October 3, 2010 in the Czech Republic. Three cities, Ostrava, Brno and Karlovy Vary, hosted games. Four countries initially bid for the event but Australia, France and Latvia withdrew during the bidding process.

The USA won its eighth title, extending its own record for the most wins in tournament history. The other medalists—the Czech Republic with silver and Spain with bronze—had not previously medaled at a World Championship. The Czechoslovakia women's team had won six medals in previous World Championships, but FIBA considers the Czech Republic and Slovakia to be separate teams from the former Czechoslovakia. The Czech Republic's Hana Horáková was chosen as the tournament's most valuable player.

Pre-tournament favourites USA, Russia, and Australia dominated play in the first two rounds, with Russia and the USA going undefeated and Australia only losing to the USA in the second round after both teams had guaranteed progression to the quarterfinals. In the quarterfinals, however, Russia and Australia suffered shock defeats to Belarus and the Czech Republic respectively. Meanwhile, the USA cruised into the final with easy wins over injury-ridden South Korea and Spain. After knocking out the defending World Champions, the Czechs defeated Belarus in overtime to set up the final with the USA.

In the final the USA were heavy favourites but the Czechs were supported by a partisan crowd of over 6000 that included Czech president Václav Klaus. The USA led for most of the match, but the Czechs were able to keep it close in the first half, trailing only 40-35 at the break. The USA pulled away in the second half to win 89-69.

== Venues ==
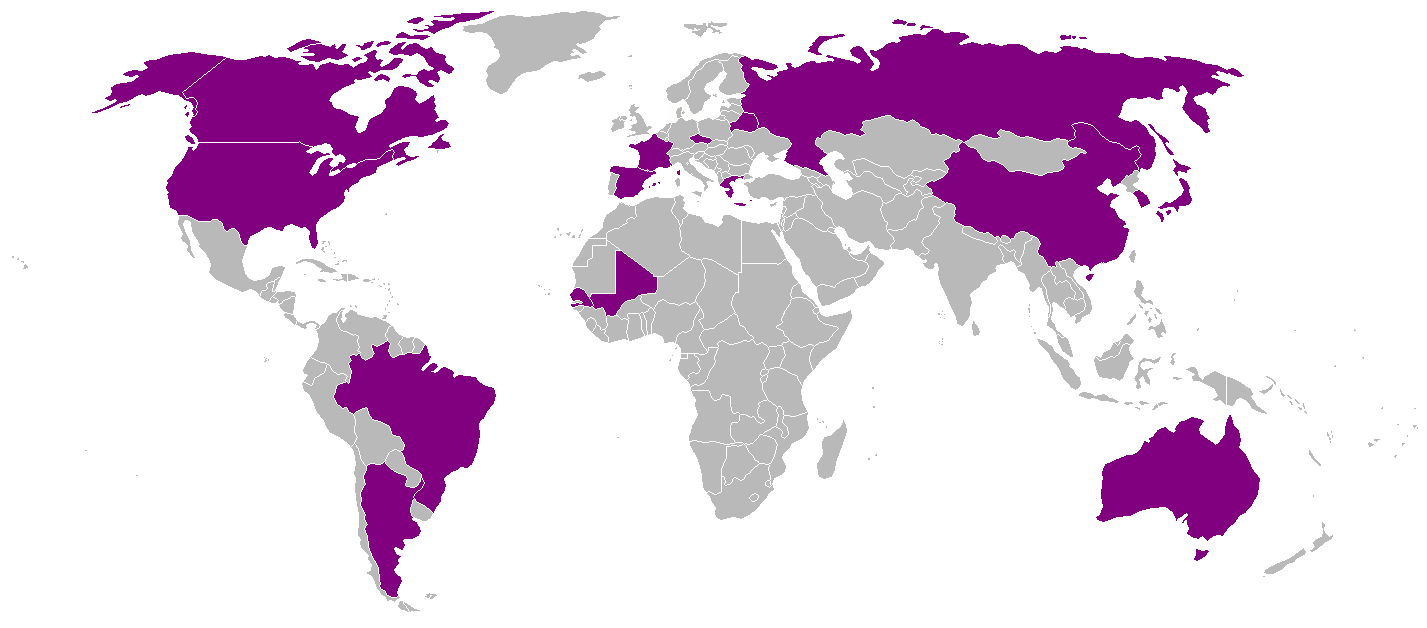
Participating nations.

The tournament was held in three cities. The Preliminary Round and the Eighth-final Round was played at Brno and Ostrava, while the Final Round was played at Karlovy Vary.

2010 FIBA World Championship for Women is located in Czech Republic
Karlovy Vary	Ostrava	Brno
KV Arena	ČEZ Aréna	Arena Vodova
Capacity: 6,000	Capacity: 9,000	Capacity: 3,200

== Qualification ==
16 teams participated in the 2010 World Championship for Women. After the 2008 Summer Olympics, the continental allocation for FIBA Americas was reduced by one when the United States won the Olympic tournament, they automatically qualified for the 2010 World Championship.

Event	Date	Location	Vacancies	Qualified
Host Nation			1	Czech Republic
2008 Summer Olympics	9–23 August 2008	(China) Beijing	1	United States
EuroBasket Women 2009	7–20 June 2009	Latvia	5	Belarus; Spain; France; Greece; Russia
2009 FIBA Oceania Championship for Women	31 August – 2 September 2009	New Zealand; Australia	1	Australia
2009 FIBA Africa Championship for Women	9–18 October 2009	(Madagascar) Antananarivo	2	Mali; Senegal
2009 FIBA Americas Championship for Women	23–27 September 2009	(Brazil) Cuiabá	3	Argentina; Brazil; Canada
2009 FIBA Asia Championship for Women	17–24 September 2009	(India) Chennai	3	China; Japan; South Korea
Total			16	

== Preliminary round ==
Times given below are in CEST (UTC+2).

=== Group A ===
Team	Pld	W	L	PF	PA	PD	Pts
Australia	3	3	0	246	174	+72	6
Belarus	3	2	1	188	189	−1	5
Canada	3	1	2	161	194	−33	4
China	3	0	3	186	224	−38	3

September 23
13:00

Report

Belarus	68–57	China
Scoring by quarter: 11–10, 20–17, 21–21, 16–9
Pts: Leuchanka 20; Rebs: Verameyenka 14; Asts: Marchanka 4		Pts: Miao, Liu, Chen N. 13; Rebs: Chen N. 11; Asts: Miao 5

ČEZ Aréna, Ostrava
Attendance: 1,650
Referees: Vicente Bulto (ESP), Ivo Dolinek (CZE), Shoko Suguro (JPN)

September 23
15:15

Report

Canada	47–72	Australia
Scoring by quarter: 12–20, 11–14, 15–18, 9–20
Pts: Smith 11; Rebs: Phillips 6 Asts: Phillips 2		Pts: Harrower, Jackson 13; Rebs: Jackson 7 Asts: Harrower 3

ČEZ Aréna, Ostrava
Attendance: 3,470
Referees: Aleksander Gorshkov (RUS), Robert Vyklicky (CZE), Gillian Lesli Ann Martindale (BAR)

September 24
13:00

Report

China	61–65	Canada
Scoring by quarter: 23–18, 14–12, 13–22, 11–13
Pts: Chen N. 22; Rebs: Ma 7 Asts: Miao 4		Pts: Smith 25; Rebs: Murphy 8 Asts: Tatham 4

ČEZ Aréna, Ostrava
Attendance: 1,020
Referees: Tomas Jasevicius (LTU), Elena Chernova (RUS), Robert Vyklicky (CZE)

September 24
15:15

Report

Australia	83–59	Belarus
Scoring by quarter: 24–21, 18–11, 13–11, 28–16
Pts: Snell 17; Rebs: Jackson 11; Asts: three players 2		Pts: Verameyenka 14; Rebs: Verameyenka 6 Asts: Tarasava, Marchanka 3

ČEZ Aréna, Ostrava
Attendance: 1,650
Referees: Fernando Jorge Sampeitro (ARG), Gabriel Chiel Baum Spalter (URU), Shoko Suguro (JPN)

September 25
13:00

Report

China	68–91	Australia
Scoring by quarter: 19–32, 17–19, 16–22, 16–18
Pts: Miao 17; Rebs: Zhang F. 5 Asts: Miao 2		Pts: Taylor 16; Rebs: Grima 8 Asts: three players 4

ČEZ Aréna, Ostrava
Attendance: 4,640
Referees: Aleksander Gorshkov (RUS), Vicente Bulto (ESP), Diniz (BRA)

September 25
18:00

Report

Canada	49–61	Belarus
Scoring by quarter: 16–20, 6–11, 11–15, 16–15
Pts: Smith 11; Rebs: Achonwa, Murphy 4 Asts: Gabriele 3		Pts: Troina 16; Rebs: Leuchanka 16; Asts: Tarasava 5

ČEZ Aréna, Ostrava
Attendance: 1,990
Referees: Ivo Dolinek (CZE), Fernando Jorge Sampietro (ARG), Gillian Lesli Ann Martindale (BAR)

=== Group B ===
Team	Pld	W	L	PF	PA	PD	Pts
United States	3	3	0	288	185	+103	6
France	3	2	1	212	181	+31	5
Greece	3	1	2	211	236	−25	4
Senegal	3	0	3	165	274	−99	3

September 23
18:00

Report

Greece	73–99	United States
Scoring by quarter: 18–32, 17–20, 15–15, 23–32
Pts: Maltsi 29; Rebs: Kaltsidou 7 Asts: Kalentzou, Kaltsidou 5		Pts: McCoughtry, Cash 16; Rebs: Charles 9 Asts: Bird 6

ČEZ Aréna, Ostrava
Attendance: 3,120
Referees: Elena Chernova (RUS), Fernando Jorge Sampietro (ARG), Robert Paulik (CZE)

September 23
20:15

Report

Senegal	45–83	France
Scoring by quarter: 13–22, 3–22, 16–11, 13–28
Pts: Traore 10; Rebs: Diop 11		Pts: Beikes, Dumerc 12; Rebs: Miyem, Amant 6 Asts: Dumerc 6

ČEZ Aréna, Ostrava
Attendance: 1,650
Referees: Gabriel Chiel Baum Spalter (URU), Karla Diniz (BRA), Tomas Jasevicius(LTU)

September 24
18:00

Report

United States	108–52	Senegal
Scoring by quarter: 30–11, 28–14, 28–11, 22–16
Pts: Moore 15; Rebs: four players 5 Asts: Moore 5		Pts: Dieng 10; Rebs: Traore, Diop 4 Asts: Diatta 5

ČEZ Aréna, Ostrava
Attendance: 1,450
Referees: Aleksander Gorshkov (RUS), Gillian Lesli Ann Martindale (BAR), Moussa Ismaila Toure (MLI)

September 24
20:15

Report

France	69–55	Greece
Scoring by quarter: 20–12, 20–11, 11–17, 18–15
Pts: Miyem 19; Rebs: Ndongue 10; Asts: Dumerc 4		Pts: Chatzinikolaou, Kaltsidou 12; Rebs: Papamichail 9 Asts: Kalentzou, Lymoura 2

ČEZ Aréna, Ostrava
Attendance: 1,920
Referees: Ivo Dolinek (CZE), Vicente Bulto (ESP), Karla Diniz (BRA)

September 25
15:15

Report

United States	81–60	France
Scoring by quarter: 13–10, 23–19, 25–19, 20–12
Pts: Taurasi 15; Rebs: Moore 8 Asts: Charles 3		Pts: Miyem 15; Rebs: Miyem, Beikes 4 Asts: Lardy, Dumerc 2

ČEZ Aréna, Ostrava
Attendance: 4,710
Referees: Elena Chernova (RUS), Robert Vyklicky (CZE), Moussa Ismaila Toure (MLI)

September 25
20:15

Report

Senegal	68–83	Greece
Scoring by quarter: 13–22, 16–18, 18–19, 21–24
Pts: Traoré 14; Rebs: Diop 11; Asts: Gueye 2		Pts: Maltsi 31; Rebs: Papamichail 7 Asts: Kalentzou 4

ČEZ Aréna, Ostrava
Attendance: 1,015
Referees: Tomas Jasevicius (LTU), Shoko Suguro (JPN), Gabriel Chiel Baum Spalter (URU)

=== Group C ===
Team	Pld	W	L	PF	PA	PD	Pts
Spain	3	3	0	233	162	+71	6
South Korea	3	2	1	198	210	−12	5
Brazil	3	1	2	197	203	−6	4
Mali	3	0	3	175	228	−53	3

September 23
15:15

Report

South Korea	61–60	Brazil
Scoring by quarter: 21–19, 12–10, 15–22, 13–9
Pts: Kim K. 14; Rebs: Jung S.M. 8 Asts: Park 7		Pts: de Souza 15; Rebs: de Souza 12; Asts: Pinto, de Souza 4

Arena Vodova, Brno
Attendance: 2,300
Referees: Roberto Chiari (ITA), Grzegorz Ziemblicki (POL), Timothy Andrew Frederick Brown (NZL)

September 23
20:15

Report

Mali	36–80	Spain
Scoring by quarter: 7–15, 6–26, 10–24, 13–15
Pts: Sissoko 12; Rebs: Coulibaly 6 Asts: Maïga-Ba 3		Pts: Valdemoro 18; Rebs: Lyttle 7 Asts: Montañana 5

Arena Vodova, Brno
Attendance: 1,685
Referees: Roberto Vasquez (PUR), Felicia Andrea Grinter (USA), Charles Foster (RSA)

September 24
15:15

Report

Spain	84–69	South Korea
Scoring by quarter: 23–23, 13–7, 21–18, 27–21
Pts: Lyttle 28; Rebs: Lyttle 15; Asts: Valdemoro 5		Pts: Beon 23; Rebs: Beon 7 Asts: Jung S.M. 5

Arena Vodova, Brno
Attendance: 1,730
Referees: Spyridon Gontas (GRE), Dawna Townsend (CAN), Charles Foster (RSA)

September 24
20:15

Report

Brazil	80–73	Mali
Scoring by quarter: 14–12, 22–19, 22–23, 22–19
Pts: Luz 20; Rebs: de Souza 6 Asts: Pinto 7		Pts: Diawara 15; Rebs: Coulibaly 15; Asts: Maïga-Ba 4

Arena Vodova, Brno
Attendance: 2,380
Referees: Nicolas Maestre (FRA), Bing Liang (CHN), Snehal Bendke (IND)

September 25
15:15

Report

Mali	66–68 (OT)	South Korea
Scoring by quarter: 9–26, 21–11, 14–13, 18–12, Overtime: 4-6
Pts: Maïga-Ba, Coulibaly 16; Rebs: Coulibaly 12; Asts: Diawara 3		Pts: Beon 21; Rebs: Jung S.M. 11; Asts: Beon 6

Arena Vodova, Brno
Attendance: 1,435
Referees: Roberto Chiari (ITA), Timothy Andrew Frederick Brown (NZL), Bing Liang (CHN)

September 25
18:00

Report

Brazil	57–69	Spain
Scoring by quarter: 15–15, 8–22, 15–23, 19–9
Pts: de Souza 14; Rebs: de Souza 13; Asts: Pinto, Gustavo 3		Pts: Valdemoro 17; Rebs: Lyttle 8 Asts: Lyttle 5

Arena Vodova, Brno
Attendance: 2,840
Referees: Nicolas Maestre (FRA), Roberto Vasquez (PUR), Vaughan Charles Mayberry (AUS)

=== Group D ===
Team	Pld	W	L	PF	PA	PD	Pts
Russia	3	3	0	218	174	+44	6
Czech Republic	3	2	1	185	168	+17	5
Japan	3	1	2	182	210	−28	4
Argentina	3	0	3	170	203	−33	3

September 23
13:00

Report

Japan	63–86	Russia
Scoring by quarter: 14–21, 24–22, 15–27, 10–16
Pts: Oga 23; Rebs: Yoshida 7 Asts: Yoshida 7		Pts: Osipova 18; Rebs: Vidmer 10; Asts: Hammon, Vidmer 4

Arena Vodova, Brno
Attendance: 2,158
Referees: Vaughan Charles Mayberry (AUS), Nicolas Maestre (FRA), Snehal Bendke (IND)

September 23
18:00

Report

Czech Republic	67–53	Argentina
Scoring by quarter: 20–12, 13–13, 15–6, 19–22
Pts: Vítečková 16; Rebs: Veselá 14; Asts: Horáková, Elhotová 3		Pts: Reggiardo 9 Rebs: Fernández 7 Asts: González 5

Arena Vodova, Brno
Attendance: 2,950
Referees: Spyridon Gontas (GRE), Dawna Townsend (CAN), Bing Liang (CHN)

September 24
13:00

Report

Argentina	58–59	Japan
Scoring by quarter: 18–17, 13–17, 11–14, 16–11
Pts: Sánchez 16; Rebs: Fernández 9 Asts: Cava, Paoletta 2		Pts: Oga 21; Rebs: Yoshida 14; Asts: Mitani 5

Arena Vodova, Brno
Attendance: 1,412
Referees: Felicia Andrea Grinter (USA), Vaughan Charles Mayberry (AUS), Timothy Andrew Frederick Brown (NZL)

September 24
18:00

Report

Russia	55–52	Czech Republic
Scoring by quarter: 12–9, 21–13, 9–14, 13–16
Pts: Hammon 13; Rebs: Stepanova 13; Asts: Arteshina, Kuzina 2		Pts: Horáková 21; Rebs: Veselá, Kulichová 6 Asts: Horáková 4

Arena Vodova, Brno
Attendance: 3,200
Referees: Roberto Chiari (ITA), Roberto Vasquez (PUR), Grzegorz Ziemblicki (POL)

September 25
13:00

Report

Argentina	59–77	Russia
Scoring by quarter: 12–23, 22–21, 9–17, 16–16
Pts: Chesta 11; Rebs: Pavón 8 Asts: Paoletta 2		Pts: Osipova 20; Rebs: Vidmer 12; Asts: three players 3

Arena Vodova, Brno
Attendance: 1,210
Referees: Dawna Townsend (CAN), Grzegorz Ziemblicki (POL), Snehal Bendke (IND)

September 25
20:15

Report

Japan	60–66	Czech Republic
Scoring by quarter: 19–22, 11–16, 16–15, 14–13
Pts: Oga 22; Rebs: Oga 6 Asts: Yoshida 3		Pts: Burgrová 14; Rebs: Bortelová, Burgrová 8 Asts: Horáková 3

Arena Vodova, Brno
Attendance: 3,100
Referees: Spyridon Gontas (GRE), Felicia Andrea Grinter (USA), Charles Foster (RSA)

== Eighth-final round ==
Qualified for the quarterfinals

=== Group E ===
Team	Pld	W	L	PF	PA	PD	Pts
United States	6	6	0	565	367	+198	12
Australia	6	5	1	476	363	+113	11
France	6	4	2	371	338	+33	10
Belarus	6	3	3	371	424	−53	9
Greece	6	2	4	392	455	−63	8
Canada	6	1	5	306	387	−81	7

September 27
15:30

Report

Greece	54–93	Australia
Scoring by quarter: 15–27, 9–29, 13–16, 17–21
Pts: Dimitrakou, Kaltsidou 10; Rebs: Papamichail 5 Asts: Kalentzou, Lymoura 2		Pts: Cambage, Jackson 20; Rebs: Jackson 12; Asts: Phillips 6

ČEZ Aréna, Ostrava
Attendance: 1,915
Referees: Elena Chernova (RUS), Tomas Jasevicius (LTU), Fernando Jorge Sampietro (ARG)

September 27
18:00

Report

France	58–48	Belarus
Scoring by quarter: 14–8, 11–12, 11–17, 22–11
Pts: Miyem 14; Rebs: Lepron 7 Asts: Dumerc 5		Pts: Leuchanka 17; Rebs: Leuchanka 14; Asts: five players 2

ČEZ Aréna, Ostrava
Attendance: 3,050
Referees: Vicente Bulto (ESP), Robert Vyklicky (CZE), Gillian Lesli Ann Martindale (BAR)

September 27
20:15

Report

United States	87–46	Canada
Scoring by quarter: 19–14, 28–11, 19–13, 21–8
Pts: Whalen 16; Rebs: Dupree 7 Asts: Moore 4		Pts: Smith, Bekkering 8 Rebs: Aubry, Smith 5 Asts: Aubry 3

ČEZ Aréna, Ostrava
Attendance: 2,620
Referees: Ivo Dolinek (CZE), Shoko Suguro (JPN), Karla Diniz (BRA)

September 28
15:30

Report

Canada	52–57	Greece
Scoring by quarter: 7–12, 13–16, 17–16, 15–13
Pts: Smith 10; Rebs: Tatham, Smith 8 Asts: Phillips, Smith 2		Pts: Papamichail 12; Rebs: Papamichail 7 Asts: Kalentzou, Kaltsidou 5

ČEZ Aréna, Ostrava
Attendance: 2,080
Referees: Vicente Bulto (ESP), Fernando Jorge Sampietro (ARG), Shoko Suguro (JPN)

September 28
18:00

Report

Australia	62–52	France
Scoring by quarter: 15–10, 19–15, 14–19, 14–8
Pts: Jackson 19; Rebs: Jackson 10; Asts: O'Hea 5		Pts: Dumerc 9 Rebs: Ndongue 7 Asts: Dumerc 4

ČEZ Aréna, Ostrava
Attendance: 3,140
Referees: Ivo Dolinek (CZE), Elena Chernova (RUS), Gillian Lesli Ann Martindale (BAR)

September 28
20:15

Report

Belarus	61–107	United States
Scoring by quarter: 11–37, 17–21, 16–27, 17–22
Pts: Kress 10; Rebs: Durieka, Kress 3 Asts: Trafimava 3		Pts: Fowles 15; Rebs: Dupree, Fowles 6 Asts: three players 4

ČEZ Aréna, Ostrava
Attendance: 3,140
Referees: Robert Vycklicky (CZE), Tomas Jasevicius (LTU), Karla Diniz (BRA)

September 29
15:30

Report

Greece	70–74	Belarus
Scoring by quarter: 18–20, 20–20, 11–14, 21–20
Pts: Kaltsidou 29; Rebs: Maltsi 5 Asts: Maltsi 1		Pts: Leuchanka 24; Rebs: Leuchanka 11; Asts: Marchanka 5

ČEZ Aréna, Ostrava
Attendance: 1,860
Referees: Vicente Bulto (ESP), Ivo Dolinek (CZE), Gillian Lesli Ann Martindale (BAR)

September 29
18:00

Report

France	49–47	Canada
Scoring by quarter: 12–16, 15–9, 6–3, 16–19
Pts: Lardy, Miyem 9 Rebs: Digbeu 5 Asts: Laborde 2		Pts: Smith, Achonwa 12; Rebs: Achonwa 8 Asts: Gabriele 5

ČEZ Aréna, Ostrava
Attendance: 4,080
Referees: Robert Vyklicky (CZE), Shoko Suguro (JPN), Karla Diniz (BRA)

September 29
20:15

Report

United States	83–75	Australia
Scoring by quarter: 29–18, 22–15, 21–24, 11–18
Pts: Taurasi 24; Rebs: Fowles 6 Asts: Taurasi 3		Pts: Cambage 18; Rebs: Cambage 7 Asts: Harrower 7

ČEZ Aréna, Ostrava
Attendance: 6,340
Referees: Fernando Jorge Sampietro (ARG), Tomas Jasevicius (LTU), Elena Chernova (RUS)

=== Group F ===
Team	Pld	W	L	PF	PA	PD	Pts
Russia	6	6	0	451	342	+109	12
Spain	6	5	1	463	354	+109	11
Czech Republic	6	4	2	422	380	+42	10
South Korea	6	3	3	376	451	−75	9
Brazil	6	2	4	413	454	−41	8
Japan	6	1	5	396	454	−58	7

September 27
15:30

Report

Japan	59–86	Spain
Scoring by quarter: 12–28, 15–22, 20–13, 12–23
Pts: Mitani 16; Rebs: Mitani 6 Asts: Ishikawa 5		Pts: Lyttle 29; Rebs: Lyttle 11; Asts: four players 3

Arena Vodova, Brno
Attendance: 1,570
Referees: Roberto Chiari (ITA), Grzegorz Ziemblicki (POL), Bing Liang (CHN)

September 27
18:00

Report

Czech Republic	96–65	South Korea
Scoring by quarter: 28–16, 21–17, 22–15, 25–17
Pts: Vítečková 27; Rebs: Horáková 7 Asts: Elhotová, Veselá 4		Pts: Beon 17; Rebs: Kim B. 5 Asts: Kim J., Kim K. 3

Arena Vodova, Brno
Attendance: 2,970
Referees: Vaughan Charles Mayberry (AUS), Roberto Vazquez (PUR), Nicolas Maestre (FRA)

September 27
20:15

Report

Russia	76–53	Brazil
Scoring by quarter: 20–13, 22–14, 17–13, 17–13
Pts: Korstin, Arteshina 11; Rebs: Arteshina 8 Asts: Osipova 4		Pts: Pinto, de Souza 11; Rebs: de Souza 14; Asts: four players 1

Arena Vodova, Brno
Attendance: 2,410
Referees: Spyridon Gontas (GRE), Felicia Andrea Grinter (USA), Dawna Townsend (CAN)

September 28
15:30

Report

Brazil	93–91 (OT)	Japan
Scoring by quarter: 24–24, 16–24, 21–14, 17–16, Overtime: 15–13
Pts: de Souza 32; Rebs: de Souza 18; Asts: Gustavo, Pinto 3		Pts: Oga 23; Rebs: Yoshida 12; Asts: Oga 6

Arena Vodova, Brno
Attendance: 1,620
Referees: Roberto Vazquez (PUR), Grzegorz Ziemblicki (POL), Vaughan Charles Mayberry (AUS)

September 28
18:00

Report

Spain	77–57	Czech Republic
Scoring by quarter: 13–18, 24–14, 23–21, 17–4
Pts: Valdemoro 25; Rebs: Lyttle 19; Asts: Valdemoro 4		Pts: Vítečková 16; Rebs: Horáková, Veselá 8 Asts: Horáková

Arena Vodova, Brno
Attendance: 3,200
Referees: Roberto Chiari (ITA), Dawna Townsend (CAN), Felicia Andrea Grinter (USA)

September 28
20:15

Report

South Korea	48–81	Russia
Scoring by quarter: 16–16, 12–13, 10–25, 10–27
Pts: Sin 14; Rebs: Beon 5 Asts: Beon, Kim K. 3		Pts: Stepanova 14; Rebs: Osipova 11; Asts: Vidmer 6

Arena Vodova, Brno
Attendance: 2,280
Referees: Spyridon Gontas (GRE), Nicolas Maestre (FRA), Bing Liang (CHN)

September 29
15:30

Report

Japan	64–65	South Korea
Scoring by quarter: 15–21, 13–12, 18–17, 18–15
Pts: Oga 17; Rebs: Yoshida 9 Asts: Yoshida 7		Pts: Jung S. M. 21; Rebs: Beon 7 Asts: Jung S. M. 6

Arena Vodova, Brno
Attendance: 1,430
Referees: Dawna Townsend (CAN), Grzegorz Ziemblicki (POL), Roberto Vazquez (PUR)

September 29
18:00

Report

Czech Republic	84–70	Brazil
Scoring by quarter: 17–20, 17–16, 26–19, 24–15
Pts: Vítečková 24; Rebs: Veselá, Vítečková 8 Asts: Horáková 6		Pts: Castro Marques 27; Rebs: de Souza 7 Asts: Luz 5

Arena Vodova, Brno
Attendance: 3,140
Referees: Felicia Andrea Grienter (USA), Vaughan Charles Mayberry (AUS), Bing Liang (CHN)

September 29
20:15

Report

Russia	76–67	Spain
Scoring by quarter: 20–25, 16–12, 18–18, 22–12
Pts: Hammon 27; Rebs: Stepanova 9 Asts: Arteshina, Danilochkina 2		Pts: Valdemoro 21; Rebs: Lyttle 12; Asts: Montañana 4

Arena Vodova, Brno
Attendance: 2,540
Referees: Roberto Chiari (ITA), Nicolas Maestre (FRA), Spyridon Gontas (GRE)

== Knockout round ==
=== Championship Bracket ===
Quarter-finals
October 1 – Karlovy Vary
United States	106
South Korea	44
October 1 – Karlovy Vary
France	71
Spain (OT)	74
October 1 – Karlovy Vary
Australia	68
Czech Republic	79
October 1 – Karlovy Vary
Belarus	70
Russia	53

Semi-finals
October 2 – Karlovy Vary
United States	106
Spain	70
October 2 – Karlovy Vary
Czech Republic (OT)	81
Belarus	77

Final
October 3 – Karlovy Vary
United States	89
Czech Republic	69
Third place
October 3 – Karlovy Vary
Spain	77
Belarus	68

=== 13th–16th playoffs ===
Semi-finals
September 28 – Karlovy Vary
China	71
Senegal	69
September 28 – Karlovy Vary
Argentina (OT)	74
Mali	69

Thirteenth place
September 29 – Karlovy Vary
China	86
Argentina	60
Fifteenth place
September 29 – Karlovy Vary
Senegal	67
Mali (OT)	69

==== 13th–16th semifinals ====
September 28
17:00

Report

China	71–69	Senegal
Scoring by quarter: 19–8, 12–22, 20–18, 20–21
Pts: Miao 22; Rebs: Liu 10; Asts: Zhang H. 5		Pts: Traore 17; Rebs: Diop 6 Asts: Sy 3

KV Arena, Karlovy Vary
Referees: Gabriel Chiel Baum Spalter (URU), Charles Foster (RSA), Moussa Ismaila Toure (MLI)

September 28
19:30

Report

Mali	69–74 (OT)	Argentina
Scoring by quarter: 22–28, 17–14, 15–14, 11–9, Overtime: 4–9
Pts: Diawara, 18; Rebs: Coulibaly, Diawara 11; Asts: Maiga Ba 4		Pts: Sanchez 21; Rebs: Mendoza 10; Asts: Mendoza 3

KV Arena, Karlovy Vary
Referees: Aleksander Gorshkov (RUS), Timothy Andrew Frederick Brown (NZL), Snehal Bendke (IND)

==== 15th place playoff ====
September 29
19:30

Report

Senegal	67–69 (OT)	Mali
Scoring by quarter: 14–18, 10–19, 17–10, 20–14, Overtime: 6–8
Pts: Traore 15; Rebs: Sy 8 Asts: Dieng 2		Pts: Diawara 14; Rebs: Coulibaly, Diawara 8 Asts: Coulibaly, Maiga Ba 2

KV Arena, Karlovy Vary
Referees: Gabriel Chiel Baum Spalter (URU), Charles Foster (RSA), Timothy Andrew Frederick Brown (NZL)

==== 13th place playoff ====
September 29
17:00

Report

China	86–60	Argentina
Scoring by quarter: 25–15, 14–17, 22–19, 25–9
Pts: Chen N. 18; Rebs: Liu 11; Asts: three players 3		Pts: Cava 18; Rebs: Fernandez 5 Asts: Pavon 5

KV Arena, Karlovy Vary
Referees: Aleksander Gorshkov (RUS), Snehal Bendke (IND), Moussa Ismaila Toure (MLI)

=== 9th–12th playoffs ===
Semi-finals
October 1 – Karlovy Vary
Greece	59
Japan	63
October 1 – Karlovy Vary
Canada	58
Brazil	64

Ninth place
October 2 – Karlovy Vary
Japan	79
Brazil	84
Eleventh place
October 2 – Karlovy Vary
Greece	71
Canada	55

==== 9th–12th semifinals ====
October 1
09:00

Report

Greece	59–63	Japan
Scoring by quarter: 11–13, 15–15, 20–19, 13–16
Pts: Maltsi 27; Rebs: Kalentzou 9 Asts: Kalentzou 4		Pts: Oga 19; Rebs: Takada 9 Asts: Yoshida 4

KV Arena, Karlovy Vary

October 1
11:00

Report

Canada	58–64	Brazil
Scoring by quarter: 11–18, 17–14, 17–13, 13–19
Pts: Smith 17; Rebs: Smith 8 Asts: Gabriele 4		Pts: Castro Marques 16; Rebs: de Souza 13; Asts: Pinto 4

KV Arena, Karlovy Vary

==== 11th place playoff ====
October 2
11:00

Report

Greece	71–55	Canada
Scoring by quarter: 21–9, 11–12, 13–17, 26–17
Pts: Kalentzou 21; Rebs: Kaltsidou 9 Asts: Kalentzou 4		Pts: Phillips 19; Rebs: Phillips 10; Asts: Pilypaitis 3

KV Arena, Karlovy Vary
Referees: Vicente Bulto (ESP), Karla Diniz (BRA), Timothy Andrew Frederick Brown (NZL)

==== 9th place playoff ====
October 2
09:00

Report

Japan	79–84	Brazil
Scoring by quarter: 31–25, 14–17, 11–20, 23–22
Pts: Oga 21; Rebs: Yoshida 8 Asts: Oga 9		Pts: Oliveira 21; Rebs: de Souza 13; Asts: Pinto 5

KV Arena, Karlovy Vary
Referees: Elena Chernova (RUS), Felicia Andrea Grinter (USA), Bing Liang (CHN)

=== 5th–8th playoffs ===
Semi-finals
October 2 – Karlovy Vary
South Korea	46
France	61
October 2 – Karlovy Vary
Australia	78
Russia	73

Fifth place
October 3 – Karlovy Vary
France	62
Australia	74
Seventh place
October 3 – Karlovy Vary
South Korea	76
Russia	87

==== 5th–8th semifinals ====
October 2
13:15

Report

Australia	78–73	Russia
Scoring by quarter: 14–14, 18–20, 18–14, 28–25
Pts: Taylor, Cambage 19; Rebs: Jackson 9 Asts: four players 1		Pts: Abrosimova 20; Rebs: Stepanova 6 Asts: Abrosimova 3

KV Arena, Karlovy Vary
Referees: Roberto Chiari (ITA), Ivo Dolinek (CZE), Fernando Jorge Sampietro (ARG)

October 2
15:30

Report

South Korea	46–61	France
Scoring by quarter: 11–15, 12–16, 9–14, 14–16
Pts: Beon 21; Rebs: Sin 6 Asts: Kim J. 3		Pts: Laborde 15; Rebs: Dumerc 8 Asts: Lardy, Lepron 4

KV Arena, Karlovy Vary
Referees: Robert Vyklicky (CZE), Roberto Vasquez (PUR), Grzegorz Ziemblicki (POL)

==== 7th place playoff ====
October 3
12:00

Report

South Korea	76–87	Russia
Scoring by quarter: 29–26, 13–21, 15–22, 19–18
Pts: Beon 24; Rebs: Beon 4 Asts: Kim J. 8		Pts: Korstin 21; Rebs: Korstin 8 Asts: Arteshina 4

KV Arena, Karlovy Vary
Referees: Robert Vyklicky (CZE), Timothy Andrew Frederick Brown (NZL), Karla Diniz (BRA)

==== 5th place playoff ====
October 3
14:45

Report

France	62–74	Australia
Scoring by quarter: 7–21, 18–15, 14–17, 23–21
Pts: Godin 11; Rebs: Amant, Jannault 4 Asts: Lardy 3		Pts: Jackson 13; Rebs: Jackson 8 Asts: Snell 2

KV Arena, Karlovy Vary
Referees: Dawna Townsend (CAN), Roberto Vazquez (PUR), Grzegorz Ziemblicki (POL)

==== Quarterfinals ====
October 1
13:15

Report

Belarus	70–53	Russia
Scoring by quarter: 23–11, 13–16, 14–8, 20–18
Pts: Leuchanka 17; Rebs: Leuchanka 9 Asts: Marchanka 4		Pts: Hammon 16; Rebs: Osipova 9 Asts: Osipova 2

KV Arena, Karlovy Vary

October 1
15:30

Report

United States	106–44	South Korea
Scoring by quarter: 28–11, 20–11, 35–7, 23–15
Pts: McCoughtry 17; Rebs: Dupree 16; Asts: Taurasi 4		Pts: Lim 10; Rebs: Beon 4 Asts: Beon 3

KV Arena, Karlovy Vary

October 1
18:30

Report

Australia	68–79	Czech Republic
Scoring by quarter: 18–15, 14–20, 19–17, 17–27
Pts: Cambage 22; Rebs: Cambage 10; Asts: O'Hea 2		Pts: Vítečková 27; Rebs: Horáková 8 Asts: Horáková 3

KV Arena, Karlovy Vary

October 1
20:45

Report

France	71–74 (OT)	Spain
Scoring by quarter: 16–14, 10–8, 26–21, 13–22, Overtime: 6–9
Pts: Ndongue 14; Rebs: Dumerc 6 Asts: Dumerc 7		Pts: Valdemoro 28; Rebs: Lyttle 9 Asts: Palau 3

KV Arena, Karlovy Vary

==== Semifinals ====
October 2
18:30

Report

Czech Republic	81–77 (OT)	Belarus
Scoring by quarter: 16–15, 16–19, 22–15, 14–19, Overtime: 13–9
Pts: Vítečková 21; Rebs: Večeřová 8 Asts: Horáková 5		Pts: Verameyenka 24; Rebs: Marchanka 8 Asts: Marchanka 4

KV Arena, Karlovy Vary
Referees: Nicolas Maestre (FRA), Vaughan Charles Mayberry (AUS), Dawna Townsend (CAN)

October 2
20:45

Report

United States	106–70	Spain
Scoring by quarter: 29–16, 29–18, 29–19, 19–17
Pts: Catchings 14; Rebs: Fowles 6 Asts: Bird 5		Pts: Fernández 16; Rebs: Pascua 5 Asts: four players 1

KV Arena, Karlovy Vary
Referees: Spyridon Gontas (GRE), Tomas Jasevicius (LTU), Shoko Suguro (JPN)

==== Bronze medal game ====
October 3
17:30

Report

Spain	77–68	Belarus
Scoring by quarter: 28–15, 13–19, 21–19, 15–15
Pts: Lyttle 22; Rebs: Lyttle 11; Asts: Montañana 4		Pts: Verameyenka 20; Rebs: Leuchanka 6 Asts: Verameyenka 3

KV Arena, Karlovy Vary
Referees: Roberto Chiari (ITA), Felicia Andrea Grinter (USA), Ivo Dolinek (CZE)

==== Final ====
October 3
20:00

Report

United States	89–69	Czech Republic
Scoring by quarter: 19–14, 21–21, 34–17, 15–17
Pts: McCoughtry 18; Rebs: Fowles 7 Asts: Bird 3		Pts: Kulichová 14; Rebs: Kulichová, Vitecková 5 Asts: Horáková 5

KV Arena, Karlovy Vary
Referees: Vicente Bulto (ESP), Fernando Jorge Sampietro (ARG), Elena Chernova (RUS)

== Statistical leaders ==
Points

Name	PPG
(Japan) Yuko Oga	19.1
(Spain) Sancho Lyttle	18.4
(Greece) Evanthia Maltsi	17.9
(Spain) Amaya Valdemoro	17.7
(Brazil) Erika de Souza	16.6

Rebounds

Name	RPG
(Brazil) Erika de Souza	12.0
(Spain) Sancho Lyttle	11.5
(Mali) Naîgnouma Coulibaly	10.4
(Belarus) Yelena Leuchanka	8.8
(Japan) Asami Yoshida	8.1

Assists

Name	APG
(Japan) Asami Yoshida	4.6
(Czech Republic) Hana Horáková	3.9
(France) Céline Dumerc (Japan) Yuko Oga	3.8
(Brazil) Adriana Moisés Pinto (China) Miao Lijie	3.4

Blocks

Name	BPG
(Czech Republic) Petra Kulichová	1.8
(Belarus) Anastasiya Verameyenka	1.7
(Brazil) Erika de Souza	1.5
(France) Emmeline Ndongue (China) Chen Nan	1.2

Steals

Name	SPG
(Czech Republic) Hana Horáková	2.9
(United States) Angel McCoughtry	2.7
(Greece) Evanthia Maltsi	2.4
(Japan) Asami Yoshida	2.1
(Canada) Teresa Gabriele	1.9

== Final standings ==
Rank	Team	Record
1	United States	9–0
2	Czech Republic	6–3
3	Spain	7–2
4	Belarus	4–5
5	Australia	7–2
6	France	5–4
7	Russia	7–2
8	South Korea	3–6
9	Brazil	4–4
10	Japan	2–6
11	Greece	3–5
12	Canada	1–7
13	China	2–3
14	Argentina	1–4
15	Mali	1–4
16	Senegal	0–5

== Awards ==
2010 FIBA World Championship for Women

United States
8th title

Most Valuable Player
(Czech Republic) Hana Horáková

=== All-Tournament Team ===
- (Czech Republic) Hana Horáková
- (United States) Diana Taurasi
- (Czech Republic) Eva Vítečková
- (Spain) Sancho Lyttle
- (Belarus) Yelena Leuchanka

== See also ==
- 2010 FIBA World Championship for Men
- 2010 Wheelchair Basketball World Championship
