= Basketball at the 2012 Summer Olympics =

Coordinates: 51.5486°N 0.0139°W

Basketball Tournament
- London 2012

Tournament details
- Games: 2012 Summer Olympics
- Host nation: United Kingdom
- City: London
- Duration: 28 July – 12 August 2012

Men's tournament
- Teams: 12
Medals
Gold medalists	United States
Silver medalists	Spain
Bronze medalists	Russia

Women's tournament
- Teams: 12
Medals
Gold medalists	United States
Silver medalists	France
Bronze medalists	Australia

Official website
- london2012.com/games/olympic-sports/basketball.php

Tournaments
← Beijing 2008	Rio 2016 →

Basketball at the 2012 Summer Olympics was the eighteenth appearance of the sport of basketball as an official Olympic medal event. It was held from 28 July to 12 August 2012. The preliminary matches and the women's quarterfinal matches were played in the new Basketball Arena in Olympic Park, which seated up to 12,000 spectators. The men's knockout games and the women's games, from semifinals onward were played in the North Greenwich Arena.

The US men's and US women's teams both successfully defended their Olympic basketball championships of 2008.

== Settings ==
Two settings in London were used for the basketball tournaments: The O2 Arena (referred to as the "North Greenwich Arena" during the Olympics) and the Basketball Arena in Olympic Park at Stratford. The North Greenwich Arena was the setting for the knockout stages for the men, and also from the semifinal games onward for the women, whereas the Basketball Arena was the setting for the preliminary rounds and the women's quarterfinals.

Greenwich, London	Basketball at the 2012 Summer Olympics (London Borough of Newham)	Stratford, London
North Greenwich Arena	Basketball at the 2012 Summer Olympics (London Borough of Newham)	Basketball Arena
Capacity: 20,000	Basketball at the 2012 Summer Olympics (London Borough of Newham)	Capacity: 12,000

== Qualification ==
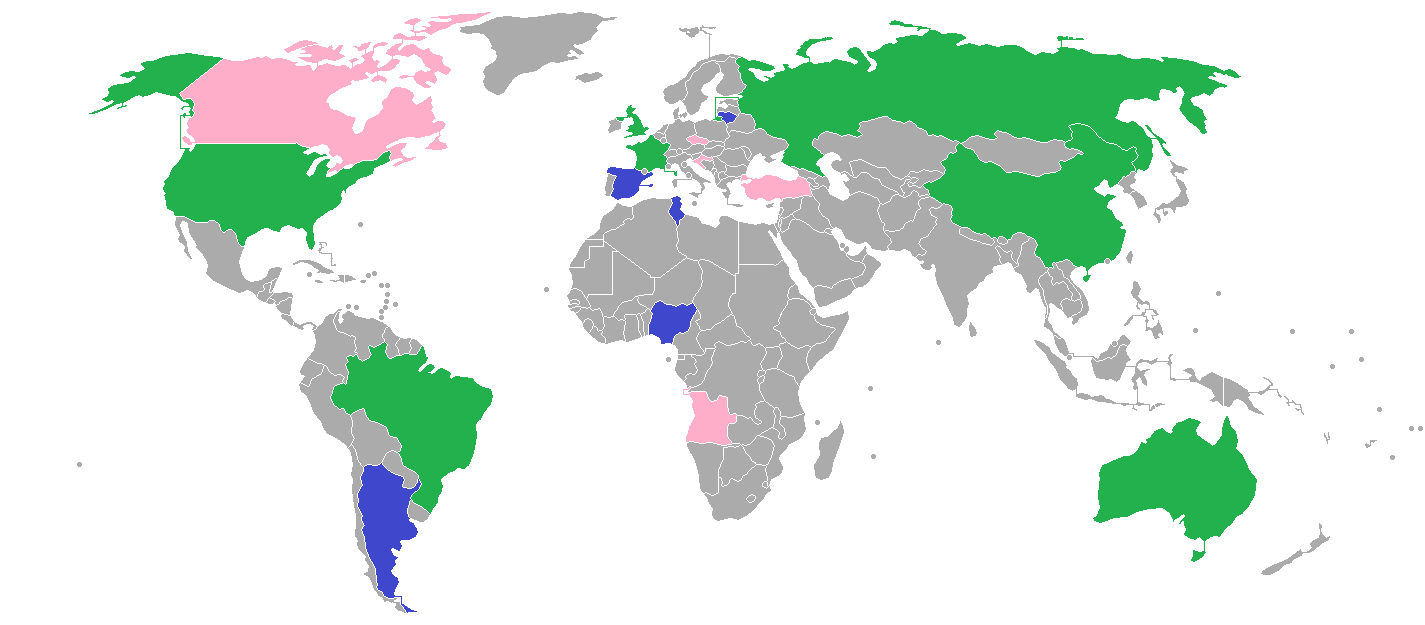
Competing countries in the Olympic basketball championship: green for both men's and women's tournaments, blue for the men's tournament and pink for the women's tournament.

The National Olympic Committees may enter up to one 12-player men's team and up to one 12-player women's team.

=== Host ===
Initially, basketball was the only team sport in which the host country was not automatically awarded a team in the tournament. This was because the British basketball teams did not exist until 2006, and hence FIBA, the world's regulatory body of basketball, was concerned about the future of the British national basketball teams after 2012, as well as the probable lack of competitiveness of the British teams. However, in a meeting held in Lyon, France, on 13 March 2011, the FIBA's executive board agreed to allow the two British teams to enter automatically after all.

=== Men's qualification ===
Means of qualification	Date	Venue	Berths	Qualified
Host nation	6 July 2005		1	Great Britain
2010 FIBA World Championship	28 August – 12 September 2010	Turkey	1	United States
2011 FIBA Africa Championship	17–28 August 2011	Madagascar	1	Tunisia
2011 FIBA Americas Championship	30 August – 11 September 2011	Argentina	2	Argentina; Brazil
2011 FIBA Oceania Championship	7–11 September 2011	Australia	1	Australia
2011 FIBA Europe Championship	31 August – 18 September 2011	Lithuania	2	Spain; France
2011 FIBA Asia Championship	15–25 September 2011	China	1	China
2012 FIBA World Olympic Qualifying Tournament	2–8 July 2012	Venezuela	3	Lithuania; Russia; Nigeria

=== Women's qualification ===
Means of qualification	Date	Venue	Berths	Qualified
Host nation	6 July 2005		1	Great Britain
2010 FIBA World Championship	23 September – 3 October 2010	Czech Republic	1	United States
2011 FIBA Europe Championship	18 June – 3 July 2011	Poland	1	Russia
2011 FIBA Asia Championship	21–28 August 2011	Japan	1	China
2011 FIBA Oceania Championship	7–11 September 2011	Australia	1	Australia
2011 FIBA Americas Championship	24 September – 1 October 2011	Colombia	1	Brazil
2011 FIBA Africa Championship	23 September – 2 October 2011	Mali	1	Angola
2012 FIBA World Olympic Qualifying Tournament	25 June – 1 July 2012	Turkey	5	France; Turkey; Czech Republic; Croatia; Canada
Total			12	

== Competition format ==
Twelve qualified nations were drawn into two groups, each consisting of six teams. Each game result merits a corresponding point:

Result	Points
Win	2
Loss, or loss by default	1
Loss via forfeiture**	0

*The team has less than two players available to play on the court.
**A team cannot present five players at the start of the game, or its actions prevent play from being resumed.

In case teams are tied on points, the tiebreaking criteria are, in order of first application:

1. Results of the games involving the tied teams (head-to-head records)
2. Goal average of the games involving the tied teams
3. Goal average of all of the games played
4. Points scored
5. Drawing of lots

The teams with the four best records qualified for the knockout stage, which was a single-elimination tournament. The semifinal winners contested for the gold medal, while the losers played for the bronze medal.

=== Calendar ===
P	Preliminaries	¼	Quarterfinals	½	Semifinals	F	Final

Event↓/Date →	Sat 28	Sun 29	Mon 30	Tue 31	Wed 1	Thu 2	Fri 3	Sat 4	Sun 5	Mon 6	Tue 7	Wed 8	Thu 9	Fri 10	Sat 11	Sun 12
Men		P		P		P		P		P		¼		½		F
Women	P		P		P		P		P		¼		½		F	

=== Men's competition ===
The draw for the groups of the men's tournament was made on 30 April 2012. Included are the teams' FIBA World Rankings prior to the tournament.

Group A	Group B
Argentina (3)	Australia (9)
France (12)	Brazil (13)
Lithuania (5)	China (10)
Nigeria (21)	Great Britain (43)
Tunisia (32)	Russia (11)
United States (1)	Spain (2)

=== Women's competition ===
The draw for the groups of the women's tournament was made on 30 April 2012. Included are the teams' FIBA World Rankings before the tournament.

Group A	Group B
Angola (27)	Australia (2)
China (7)	Brazil (6)
Croatia (31)	Canada (11)
Czech Republic (4)	France (8)
Turkey (21)	Great Britain (49)
United States (1)	Russia (3)

== Referees ==
The International Basketball Federation (FIBA) named the following 30 referees to officiate the basketball games at the 2012 Olympics.

- MAR Samir Abaakil
- TUR Recep Ankaralı
- ESP Juan Carlos Arteaga
- AUS Michael Aylen
- SRB Ilija Belošević
- IND Snehal Bendke
- PUR José Anibal Carrion
- ITA Guerrino Cerebuch
- RUS Elena Chernova
- GRE Christos Christodoulou
- FRA Carole Delauné
- ARG Pablo Alberto Estévez
- BRA Marcos Fornies Benito
- KEN Vitalis Odhiambo Gode
- USA Felicia Andrea Grinter
- FIN Carl Jungebrand
- USA William Gene Kennedy
- ITA Luigi Lamonica
- LAT Oļegs Latiševs
- GER Robert Lottermoser
- BRA Cristiano Jesus Maranho
- AUS Vaughan Charles Mayberry
- LIB Rabah Noujaim
- CHN Peng Ling
- SLO Saša Pukl
- UKR Borys Ryschyk
- ARG Fernando Jorge Sampietro
- CAN Stephen Seibel
- JPN Shoko Sugruro
- PUR Jorge Vázquez

== Medal summary ==
=== Medal table ===
Rank	Nation	Gold	Silver	Bronze	Total
1	United States	2	0	0	2
2	France	0	1	0	1
2	Spain	0	1	0	1
4	Australia	0	0	1	1
4	Russia	0	0	1	1
Totals (5 entries)		2	2	2	6

=== Events ===
Event	Gold	Silver	Bronze
Men	United States Tyson Chandler; Kevin Durant; LeBron James; Russell Westbrook; Deron Williams; Andre Iguodala; Kobe Bryant; Kevin Love; James Harden; Chris Paul; Anthony Davis; Carmelo Anthony	Spain Pau Gasol; Rudy Fernández; Sergio Rodríguez; Juan Carlos Navarro; José Calderón; Felipe Reyes; Víctor Claver; Fernando San Emeterio; Sergio Llull; Marc Gasol; Serge Ibaka; Víctor Sada	Russia Alexey Shved; Timofey Mozgov; Sergey Karasev; Vitaly Fridzon; Alexander Kaun; Evgeny Voronov; Victor Khryapa; Semyon Antonov; Sergey Monya; Dmitry Khvostov; Anton Ponkrashov; Andrei Kirilenko
Women	United States Lindsay Whalen; Seimone Augustus; Sue Bird; Maya Moore; Angel McCoughtry; Asjha Jones; Tamika Catchings; Swin Cash; Diana Taurasi; Sylvia Fowles; Tina Charles; Candace Parker	France Isabelle Yacoubou; Endéné Miyem; Clémence Beikes; Sandrine Gruda; Edwige Lawson-Wade; Céline Dumerc; Florence Lepron; Émilie Gomis; Marion Laborde; Élodie Godin; Emmeline Ndongue; Jennifer Digbeu	Australia Jenna O'Hea; Samantha Richards; Jennifer Screen; Abby Bishop; Suzy Batkovic; Kathleen MacLeod; Kristi Harrower; Laura Summerton; Belinda Snell; Rachel Jarry; Liz Cambage; Lauren Jackson

== Final standings ==
Rank	Men				Women			
Rank	Team	Pld	W	L	Team	Pld	W	L
1st place, gold medalist(s)	United States	8	8	0	United States	8	8	0
2nd place, silver medalist(s)	Spain	8	5	3	France	8	7	1
3rd place, bronze medalist(s)	Russia	8	6	2	Australia	8	6	2
4th	Argentina	8	4	4	Russia	8	5	3
Eliminated at the quarterfinals
5th	Brazil	6	4	2	Turkey	6	4	2
6th	France	6	4	2	China	6	3	3
7th	Australia	6	3	3	Czech Republic	6	2	4
8th	Lithuania	6	2	4	Canada	6	2	4
Preliminary round 5th placers
9th	Great Britain	5	1	4	Brazil	5	1	4
10th	Nigeria	5	1	4	Croatia	5	1	4
Preliminary round 6th placers
11th	Tunisia	5	0	5	Great Britain	5	0	5
12th	China	5	0	5	Angola	5	0	5

== See also ==
- Wheelchair basketball at the 2012 Summer Paralympics
