= 2012 FIBA World Olympic Qualifying Tournament for Women =

2012 FIBA World Olympic Qualifying Tournament
For Women

Tournament details
- Host country: Turkey
- Dates: 25 June – 1 July
- Teams: 12 (from 5 federations)
- Venue: 1 (in 1 host city)

Official website
- OQT Turkey

The 2012 FIBA World Olympic Qualifying Tournament for Women was a women's basketball tournament that consisted of 12 national teams, where the top five teams earned a place in the 2012 Olympics basketball tournament. It was held on 25 June – 1 July 2012 at the Ankara Arena in Ankara, Turkey.

== Qualification ==
Competition	Vacancies	Qualified
2011 FIBA European Championship	4 teams	Turkey; France; Czech Republic; Croatia
2011 FIBA Americas Championship	3 teams	Argentina; Canada; Puerto Rico
2011 FIBA African Championship	2 teams	Mali; Mozambique
2011 FIBA Asian Championship	2 teams	Japan; South Korea
2011 FIBA Oceania Championship	1 team	New Zealand

- Cuba renounced the right to compete in the World Olympic Qualifying Tournament for Women. In these circumstances, the FIBA has chosen Puerto Rico, the best team in the Americas Championship after Cuba.
- Senegal and Nigeria renounced the right to compete in the World Olympic Qualifying Tournament for Women. In these circumstances, the FIBA has chosen Mozambique, the best team in the African Championship after Senegal and Nigeria.

== Format ==
The 12 teams were divided into four groups (Groups A–D) for the preliminary round. The top two teams from each group qualified for the knockout round. All four quarterfinal winners advanced to the Olympics, the four quarterfinal losers played two rounds to allocate the final slot.

== Preliminary round ==
Qualified for the quarterfinals

All times are local (UTC+3)

=== Group A ===
Team	W	L	PCT	PF	PA	Diff	Pts.
Turkey	2	0	1.000	130	102	+28	4
Japan	1	1	.500	128	135	−7	3
Puerto Rico	0	2	.000	123	144	−21	2

25 June
19:00

Report

Puerto Rico	53–65	Turkey
Scoring by quarter: 12–24, 10–11, 17–15, 14–15
Pts: Sepúlveda 20; Rebs: Rosado, Sepúlveda 6 Asts: Sepúlveda, Cortijo 3		Pts: Palazoğlu, Hollingsworth 13; Rebs: Hollingsworth 9 Asts: Çağlar 4

Ankara, Turkey
Referees: Srdan Dozai (CRO), Jasmina Juras (SRB), Naftal Candido Chongo (MOZ)

26 June
19:00

Report

Turkey	65–49	Japan
Scoring by quarter: 16–8, 20–15, 16–16, 13–10
Pts: Yılmaz 16; Rebs: Çağlar 8 Asts: Vardarlı, Yılmaz 5		Pts: Mamiya 17; Rebs: Yoshida 8 Asts: Yoshida 5

Ankara, Turkey
Referees: Roberto Chiari (ITA), Amy Lynn Bonner (USA), Rafael Britanico (PHI)

27 June
16:45

Report

Japan	79–70	Puerto Rico
Scoring by quarter: 19–11, 11–17, 22–15, 27–27
Pts: Mamiya 29; Rebs: Mamiya 15; Asts: Yoshida 7		Pts: Sepúlveda 24; Rebs: Placido 10; Asts: Rosado 4

Ankara, Turkey
Referees: Srdan Dozai (CRO), Elias Koromilas (GRE), Yudith Hodelin Mendoza (CUB)

=== Group B ===
Team	W	L	PCT	PF	PA	Diff	Pts.
Czech Republic	2	0	1.000	138	105	+33	4
Argentina	1	1	.500	108	119	−11	3
New Zealand	0	2	.000	102	124	−22	2

25 June
16:45

Report

Czech Republic	70–51	New Zealand
Scoring by quarter: 20–6, 24–19, 10–10, 16–16
Pts: Vitecková 22; Rebs: Kulichová 13; Asts: Horáková 4		Pts: Harmon 9 Rebs: Harmon 7 Asts: Cocks 3

Ankara, Turkey
Referees: Rafael Britanico (PHI), Amy Lynn Bonner (USA), Keming Wen (CHN)

26 June
16:45

Report

New Zealand	51–54	Argentina
Scoring by quarter: 16–14, 12–18, 9–11, 14–11
Pts: Taylor 19; Rebs: four players 6 Asts: Mellars 2		Pts: Sánchez 16; Rebs: Burani 10; Asts: three players 2

Ankara, Turkey
Referees: Srdan Dozai (CRO), Elias Koromilas (GRE), Jasmina Juras (SRB)

27 June
19:00

Report

Argentina	54–68	Czech Republic
Scoring by quarter: 9–19, 13–11, 11–24, 23–14
Pts: Gretter 13; Rebs: Cabrera 5 Asts: Pavón 2		Pts: Kulichová 13; Rebs: Kulichová 20; Asts: Horáková, Hanušová 3

Ankara, Turkey
Referees: Roberto Chiari (ITA), Amy Lynn Bonner (USA), Timothy Andrew Frederick Brown (NZL)

=== Group C ===
Team	W	L	PCT	PF	PA	Diff	Pts.
Croatia	2	0	1.000	167	137	+30	4
South Korea	1	1	.500	146	148	−2	3
Mozambique	0	2	.000	127	155	−28	2

25 June
14:30

Report

Croatia	84–62	Mozambique
Scoring by quarter: 27–12, 15–13, 15–20, 27–17
Pts: Lelas 20; Rebs: Salopek 9 Asts: Jelavić 9		Pts: Machanguana 23; Rebs: Machanguana 13; Asts: Ngulela 5

Ankara, Turkey
Referees: Roberto Chiari (ITA), Jose Martin (ESP), Timothy Andrew Frederick Brown (NZL)

26 June
14:30

Report

Mozambique	65–71	South Korea
Scoring by quarter: 19–19, 18–16, 13–17, 15–19
Pts: Dongue 16; Rebs: Dongue 10; Asts: Ngulela 7		Pts: Sin Jung-Ja 25; Rebs: Sin Jung-Ja 11; Asts: Choi Yoon-Ah 6

Ankara, Turkey
Referees: Heros Avanesian (IRI), Zdravko Rutesic (MNE), Yudith Hodelin Mendoza (CUB)

27 June
14:30

Report

South Korea	75–83	Croatia
Scoring by quarter: 19–16, 13–23, 19–19, 24–25
Pts: Beon Yeon-Ha 19; Rebs: Sin Jung-Ja 13; Asts: Choi Yoon-Ah 5		Pts: Vrsaljko 26; Rebs: Salopek, Vrsaljko 7 Asts: four players 4

Ankara, Turkey
Referees: Naftal Candido Chongo (MOZ), Jose Martin (ESP), Heros Avanesian (IRI)

=== Group D ===
Team	W	L	PCT	PF	PA	Diff	Pts.
France	2	0	1.000	143	80	+63	4
Canada	1	1	.500	136	79	+57	3
Mali	0	2	.000	56	176	−120	2

25 June
21:15

Report

Mali	23–89	Canada
Scoring by quarter: 6–22, 4–24, 4–19, 9–24
Pts: N. Traore 7 Rebs: Sininta 9 Asts: Gandega, Sininta 1		Pts: Pilypaitis 15; Rebs: Smith, Tatham 8 Asts: Pilypaitis 10

Ankara, Turkey
Referees: Elias Koromilas (GRE), Zdravko Rutesic (MNE), Heros Avanesian (IRI)

26 June
21:15

Report

Canada	47–56	France
Scoring by quarter: 11–21, 13–14, 12–13, 11–8
Pts: Thorburn, Tatham 7 Rebs: Phillips 8 Asts: four players 2		Pts: Yacoubou 15; Rebs: Gruda, Ndongue 6 Asts: Dumerc 5

Ankara, Turkey
Referees: Jose Martin (ESP), Timothy Andrew Frederick Brown (NZL), Naftal Candido Chongo (MOZ)

27 June
21:15

Report

France	87–33	Mali
Scoring by quarter: 18–10, 23–7, 28–5, 18–11
Pts: Miyem 17; Rebs: Miyem, Godin 10; Asts: Dumerc 8		Pts: N. Traore 14; Rebs: A. Traore 5 Asts: Gandega, Sininta 1

Ankara, Turkey
Referees: Jasmina Juras (SRB), Rafael Britanico (PHI), Keming Wen (CHN)

== Knockout stage ==
Note: Italicized teams qualify for the Olympics.

Quarterfinals; June 29
A1	Turkey	72
B2	Argentina	58
C1	Croatia	59
D2	Canada	56
B1	Czech Republic	53
A2	Japan	47
D1	France	80
C2	South Korea	63

Semifinals (quarterfinal losers); June 30
B2	Argentina	41
D2	Canada	58
A2	Japan	79
C2	South Korea	51

Final; July 1
D2	Canada	71
A2	Japan	63

=== Quarterfinals ===
29 June
14:30

Report

Croatia	59–56	Canada
Scoring by quarter: 17–16, 16–10, 8–20, 18–10
Pts: Ivezić 12; Rebs: Ivanković, Ivezić 5 Asts: Jelavić 5		Pts: Pilypaitis 11; Rebs: Gabriele, Smith 7 Asts: four players 2

Ankara, Turkey
Referees: Roberto Chiari (ITA), Amy Lynn Bonner (USA), Keming Wen (CHN)

29 June
16:45

Report

Czech Republic	53–47	Japan
Scoring by quarter: 17–4, 12–14, 14–13, 10–16
Pts: Kulichová 14; Rebs: Kulichová 15; Asts: Elhotová 5		Pts: Mamiya 16; Rebs: Mamiya 4 Asts: Yoshida 5

Ankara, Turkey
Referees: Elias Koromilas (GRE), Jasmina Juras (SRB), Heros Avanesian (IRI)

29 June
19:00

Report

Turkey	72–58	Argentina
Scoring by quarter: 14–8, 21–7, 20–25, 17–18
Pts: Yılmaz 17; Rebs: Hollingsworth 8 Asts: Vardarlı 11		Pts: Gretter 17; Rebs: Burani 7 Asts: Gretter 2

Ankara, Turkey
Referees: Srdan Dozai (CRO), Jose Martin (ESP), Yudith Hodelin Mendoza (CUB)

29 June
21:15

Report

France	80–63	South Korea
Scoring by quarter: 19–20, 20–10, 21–12, 20–21
Pts: Gruda 19; Rebs: Yacoubou 10; Asts: Lawson-Wade 8		Pts: Sin Jung-Ja 17; Rebs: Sin Jung-Ja 6 Asts: Sin Jung-Ja 3

Ankara, Turkey
Referees: Zdravko Rutesic (MNE), Rafael Britanico (PHI), Timothy Andrew Frederick Brown (NZL)

=== Semifinals ===
30 June
18:00

Report

Japan	79–51	South Korea
Scoring by quarter: 29–4, 18–16, 18–13, 14–18
Pts: Oga 20; Rebs: Mamiya 8 Asts: Yoshida, Oga 6		Pts: Sin Jung-Ja 17; Rebs: Sin Jung-Ja 9 Asts: Han Chae-Jin 3

Ankara, Turkey
Referees: Srdan Dozai (CRO), Amy Lynn Bonner (USA), Yudith Hodelin Mendoza (CUB)

30 June
20:15

Report

Argentina	41–58	Canada
Scoring by quarter: 15–16, 4–10, 6–10, 16–22
Pts: Boquete 11; Rebs: Pavón 7 Asts: González 3		Pts: Pilypaitis 12; Rebs: four players 6 Asts: Gabriele, Thorburn 4

Ankara, Turkey
Referees: Roberto Chiari (ITA), Timothy Andrew Frederick Brown (NZL), Jasmina Juras (SRB)

=== Final ===
1 July
18:00

Report

Canada	71–63	Japan
Scoring by quarter: 21–11, 16–20, 15–11, 19–21
Pts: Pilypaitis 21; Rebs: Phillips 8 Asts: Pilypaitis 6		Pts: Takada, Mamiya 14; Rebs: Takada 8 Asts: Yoshida 13

Ankara, Turkey
Referees: Jose Martin (ESP), Elias Koromilas (GRE), Naftal Candido Chongo (MOZ)

== Final standings ==
#	Team	W–L	Qualification
Q	Turkey	3–0	Qualify to the Olympics
Q	Croatia	3–0	Qualify to the Olympics
Q	Czech Republic	3–0	Qualify to the Olympics
Q	France	3–0	Qualify to the Olympics
Q	Canada	3–2	Qualify to the Olympics
6	Japan	2–3	
7	Argentina	1–3	
8	South Korea	1–3	
9	Puerto Rico	0–2	
10	New Zealand	0–2	
11	Mozambique	0–2	
12	Mali	0–2	

== See also ==
- 2012 FIBA World Olympic Qualifying Tournament for Men
