= 2015 FIBA Europe SuperCup Women =

Basketball tournament in Europe

Tournament details
- Arena: Braine-l'Alleud, Belgium
- Dates: 6–7 October 2015

Final positions
- Champions: (Czech Republic) ZVVZ USK Praha
- Runners-up: (Russia) UMMC Ekaterinburg
- Third place: (Belgium) Royal Castors Braine
- Fourth place: (France) ESB Villeneuve-d'Ascq

Awards and statistics
- MVP: (Czech Republic) Elhotová
- Top scorer(s): (Czech Republic) Elhotová (32)

The 2015 FIBA Europe SuperCup Women was the 5th edition of the FIBA Europe SuperCup Women. It was held on 6 and 7 October 2015. After being discontinued in the year 2014, it resumed with a Final Four format with the two finalists of the Euroleague Women and the EuroCup Women. All games were played in Braine-l'Alleud, Belgium.

== Bracket ==
Semifinals
(Belgium) Royal Castors Braine	74
(Czech Republic) ZVVZ USK Praha	83
(Russia) UMMC Ekaterinburg	86
(France) ESB Villeneuve-d'Ascq	52

Final
(Czech Republic) ZVVZ USK Praha	93
(Russia) UMMC Ekaterinburg	91
Third place
(Belgium) Royal Castors Braine	71
(France) ESB Villeneuve-d'Ascq	67

== Semifinals ==
All times are CET (UTC+1).

=== Semifinal 1 ===
6 October 2015
18:45

Report

Royal Castors Braine (Belgium)	74–83	(Czech Republic) ZVVZ USK Praha
Scoring by quarter: 19:22, 24:16, 9:31, 22:14
Pts: Iagupova (20); Rebs: four players Asts: Carpréaux (6)		Pts: Elhotova (32); Rebs: Vaughn (8); Asts: Palau (7)

Braine-l'Alleud
Attendance: 1.000
Referees: Jasmina Juras (SRB), Carole Delauné (FRA), Joske Kuut (NED)

=== Semifinal 2 ===
6 October 2015
21:15

Report

UMMC Ekaterinburg (Russia)	86–52	(France) ESB Villeneuve-d'Ascq
Scoring by quarter: 23:17, 28:10, 19:16, 16:9
Pts: Lyttle (23); Rebs: Lyttle (10); Asts: Taurasi (7)		Pts: Amant (11); Rebs: three players (5); Asts: Kaltsidou (2)

Braine-l'Alleud
Attendance: 1.000
Referees: Nick Van den Broeck (BEL), Sonia Teixeira (POR), Vincent Delestrée (BEL)

== Match for 3rd place ==
7 October 2015
18:45

Report

Royal Castors Braine (Belgium)	71–67	ESB Villeneuve-d'Ascq (France)
Scoring by quarter: 17:20, 21:9, 14:14, 19:24
Pts: Iagupova 22; Rebs: three playeres 6 Asts: Carpréaux 7		Pts: Kaltsidou 14; Rebs: Kaltsidou, Gaye 5 Asts: Brémont 3

Braine-l'Alleud
Attendance: 1.000
Referees: Jasmina Juras (SRB), Sonia Teixeira (POR), Joske Kuut (NED)

== Final ==
7 October 2015
21:15

Report

ZVVZ USK Praha (Czech Republic)	93–91	(Russia) UMMC Ekaterinburg
Scoring by quarter: 31:22, 17:25, 25:24, 20:20
Pts: Xargay 21; Rebs: Palau 8 Asts: Palau 13		Pts: Taurasi 28; Rebs: Lyttle 13; Asts: Taurasi, Barič 5

Braine-l'Alleud
Attendance: 1.000
Referees: Carole Delauné (FRA), Nick Van den Broeck (BEL), Vincent Delestrée (BEL)

2015 FIBA Europe SuperCup Women winner

ZVVZ USK Praha
1st Title
