= 2012 FIBA World Olympic Qualifying Tournament =

2012 FIBA World Olympic Qualifying Tournament may refer to:

- 2012 FIBA World Olympic Qualifying Tournament for Men
- 2012 FIBA World Olympic Qualifying Tournament for Women
