= Edita Šujanová =

Czech basketball player

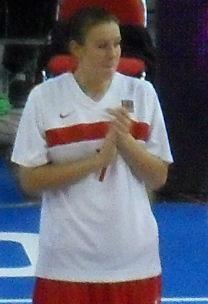
- Edita Šujanová (2010)

Medal record

Representing Czech Republic

Women's basketball

World Championships
Silver medal – second place	2010 Czech Republic	National team

Edita Šujanová (born 23 May 1985) is a Czech basketball player who competed in the 2008 Summer Olympics.
