= Tatiana Vidmer =

Russian basketball player

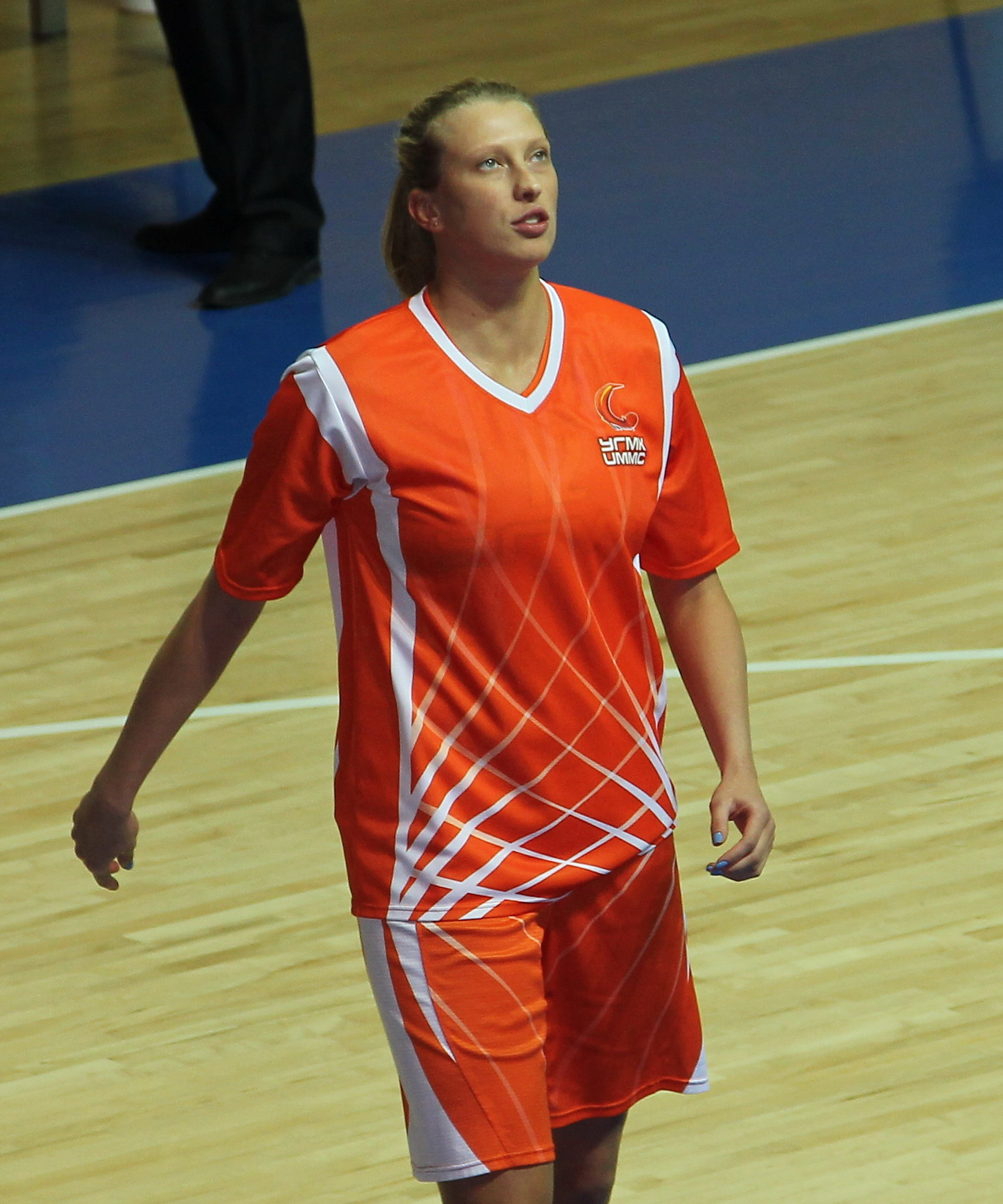
- Vidmer in 2012

Personal information
- Born: 8 January 1986 (age 40) Moscow, Russia
- Height: 191 cm (6 ft 3 in)
- Weight: 83 kg (183 lb)

Sport
- Sport: Basketball
- Club: Chevakata Vologda (2006–09); Ekaterinburg (2009–11); Dynamo Moscow (2012-14); Dynamo Kursk (2015-)
Medal record
Representing Russia
European Championships
Gold medal – first place	2011 Poland	Team

Tatiana Viktorovna Vidmer (née Bokareva, Russian: Татьяна Викторовна Видмер; born 8 January 1986) is a Russian basketball power forward. She is a member of the Russian national team and played at the EuroBasket 2011 and at the 2010 World Championship, where she topped the steals, blocked shots and assists statistics. At the club level she won the EuroCup in 2013 and 2014 with Dynamo Moscow.

In 2009, she married Vsevolod Vidmer and changed her last name from Bokareva to Vidmer. Around January 2015 she gave birth to a son.

Her team Dynamo Kursk won the 2017 Euroleague, defeating in the final Turkish Fenerbahçe.
