= Dimitra Kalentzou =

Greek basketball player

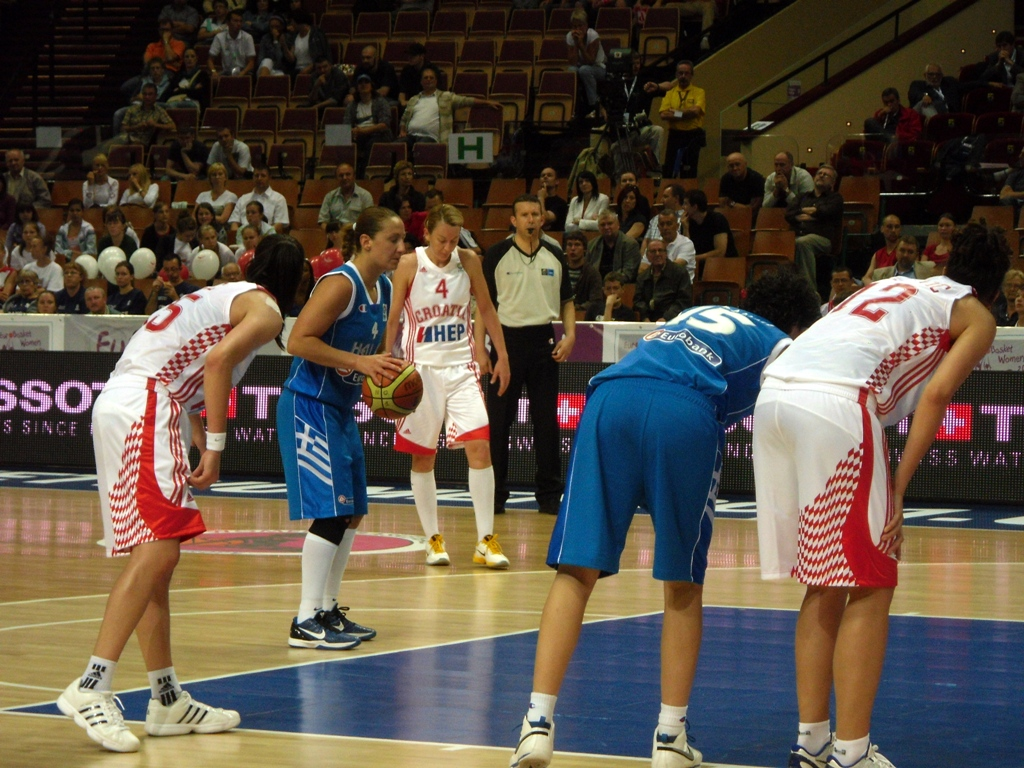

Personal information
- Born: January 3, 1978 (age 48) Athens, Greece
- Listed height: 5 ft 8.5 in (1.74 m)
- Listed weight: 160 lb (73 kg)
- Position: Point guard
- Number: 4

Dimitra Kalentzou (Δήμητρα (Τούλα) Καλέντζου) is a retired Greek professional basketball player. She played for Panathinaikos and Greece women's national basketball team. She has represented national team in several Eurobasket Women and in 2010 FIBA World Championship for Women.
