= Carolina Sanchez =

Journalist

- Born: 19 September 1971 (age 54); Maracay
- Other names: La Chama
- Citizenship: Costa Rica
- Occupation: Presenter
- Years active: 2009–2014
- Height: 1.76 m (5 ft 9 in)
- Spouse: Fernando Altmann

Julia Carolina Sánchez Rangel, also known as La Chama (b. 19 September 1971), is a Venezuela-born Costa Rican journalist, presenter, and businesswoman. She is known for her work on Repretel's Channel 11.

== Biography ==
In 1981, Sánchez moved from her native Maracay, Venezuela to pursue a career in journalism and to wed Costa Rican businessman Carlos Rodríguez. Previously, she had acquired a degree in journalism from the Andrés Bello Catholic University in Caracas and worked as a production assistant for an advertising firm and a sports presenter on radio and television, edited for an entertainment magazine, and reporter for the newspaper El Siglo. While she divorced Rodríguez over infidelity, she would graduate cum laude from the University of Costa Rica with a master's degree. In 2009, Sánchez joined Repretel's Channel 11. On 15 April 2014, Sánchez put in her resignation from the Channel 11 program Las Historias citing growing responsibilities at her other job for Claro Costa Rica and officially left the channel exactly one month later to the dismay of the show's director.

On 2 January 2013, while on a cruise in the Caribbean Sea, she met her future husband Fernando Altmann, who had watched Sánchez as "La Chama" on Channel 11. On 24 September 2015, Sánchez married Altmann after a three-year courtship.
