= Natalya Zhedik =

Russian basketball player

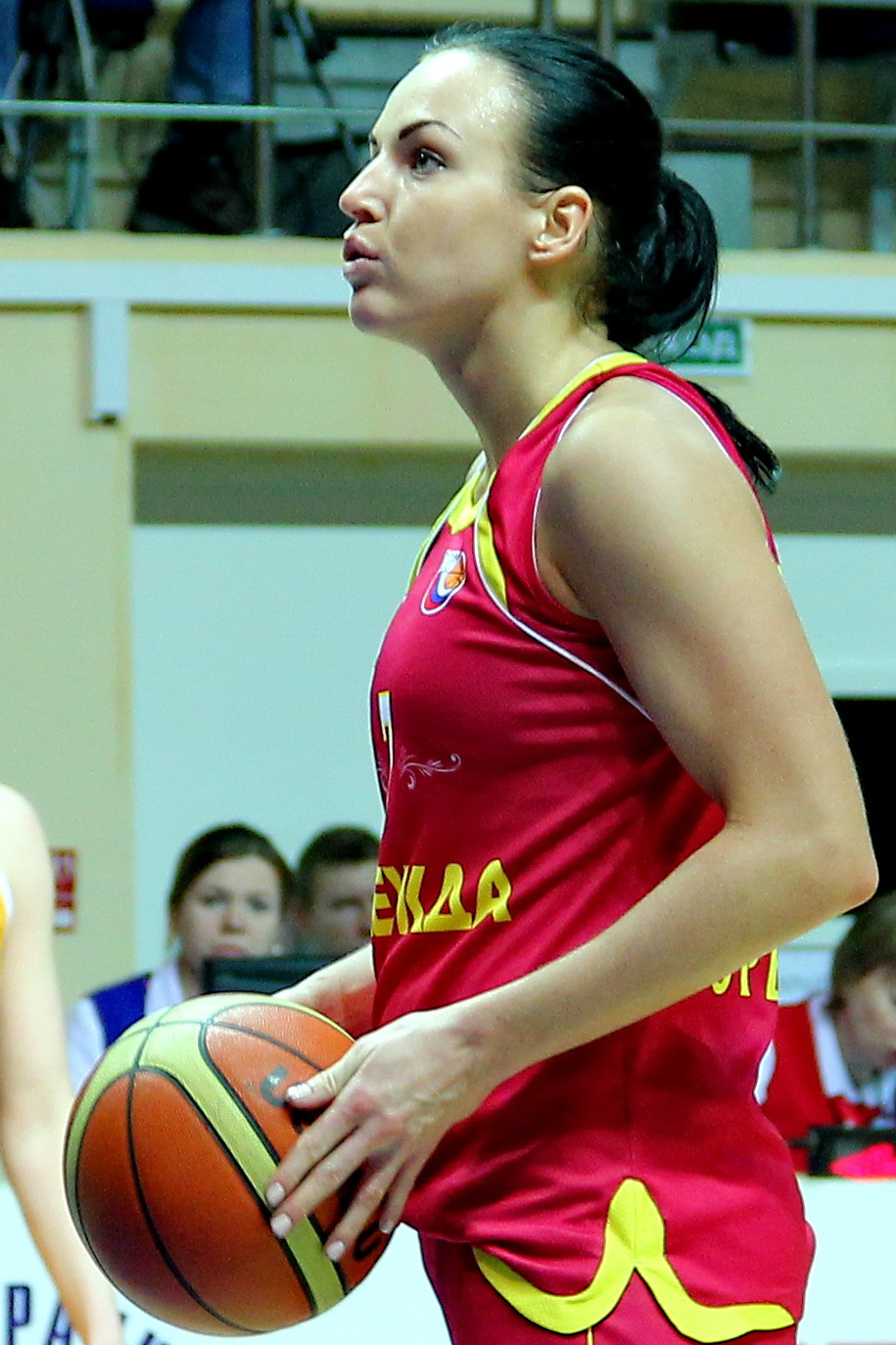
- Zhedik in 2013

No. 3 – Nadezhda Orenburg
- Position: Shooting guard
- League: RPL

Personal information
- Born: 11 July 1988 (age 38) Leningrad, Russia
- Listed height: 6 ft 0 in (1.83 m)
- Listed weight: 163 lb (74 kg)

Career information
- Playing career: 2007–present

Career history
- 2007–2010: WBC Spartak Saint Petersburg
- 2010–2011: Dynamo Moscow
- 2011–2017: Nadezhda Orenburg
- 2017–2020: Dynamo Kursk
- 2020–present: Nadezhda Orenburg

Natalya Valeryevna Zhedik (Russian: Наталья Валерьевна Жедик; born 11 July 1988) is a Russian professional basketball player. She plays for Nadezhda Orenburg from RPL and the Russia women's national basketball team and competed in the 2012 Summer Olympics.
