= Lubor Blažek =

Czech basketball coach

Lubor Blažek (born 28 February 1954 in Prague) is a Czech basketball coach. At the 2012 Summer Olympics he coached the Czech Republic women's national basketball team.
