= Marina Kress =

Belarusian basketball player

No. 15 – Horizont Minsk
- Position: Center
- League: BPL

Personal information
- Born: 23 August 1980 (age 46) Minsk, Belarus
- Listed height: 6 ft 4 in (1.93 m)
- Listed weight: 185 lb (84 kg)

Career information
- Playing career: 1995–present

Career history
- 1995–1996: RUOR Minsk
- 1996–1999: Horizont Minsk
- 1999–2000: Vologda
- 2000–2001: Dynamo Moscow
- 2001–2003: Lącznosc Olsztyn
- 2003–2004: Villeneuve-d'Ascq
- 2004: Pécs
- 2004–2006: Wisła Kraków
- 2007: Berezina Borisov
- 2008: Extrugasa Vilagarcia
- 2008–2009: Galatasaray
- 2009–2010: Tarsus Belediyespor
- 2010–2011: Sony Athinaikos
- 2011–2016: Botaş SK
- 2016–: Horizont Minsk

Marina Kress (born 23 August 1980) is a Belarusian professional basketball player currently playing for Horizont Minsk.

== Honors ==
- Galatasaray
  - Turkish Presidents Cup
    - Winners: 2007–2008
  - EuroCup Women
    - Winners: 2008–2009
