= Silvia Gustavo =

Brazilian basketball player (born 1982)

Silvia Cristina Gustavo Rocha (born 1982) is a Brazilian female basketball player. At the 2012 Summer Olympics, she competed for the Brazil women's national basketball team in the women's event. She is 6 ft 1 in (1.85 m) tall.
