= Anaël Lardy =

French basketball player

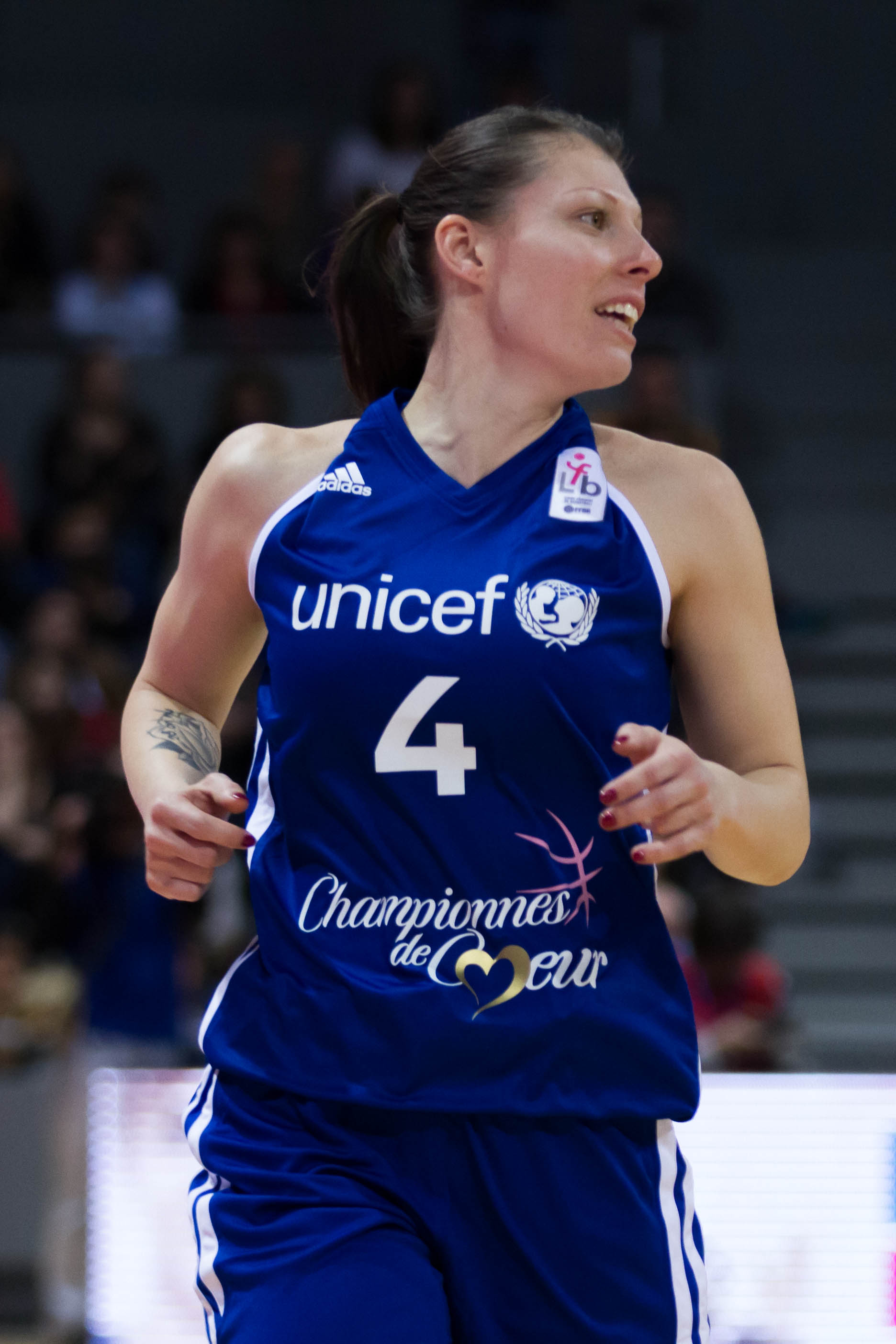

ASPTT Arras
- Position: Guard
- League: LFB

Personal information
- Born: October 24, 1987 (age 39)
- Listed height: 5 ft 7 in (1.70 m)

Anaël Lardy (born 24 October 1987) is a French basketball player for ASPTT Arras and the French national team, where she participated at the 2014 FIBA World Championship.
