= Kateřina Elhotová =

Czech basketball player

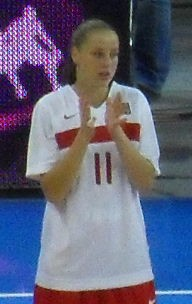

No. 11 – USK Praha
- Position: Small forward
- League: ŽBL

Personal information
- Born: 14 October 1989 (age 37) Prague, Czechoslovakia
- Listed height: 5 ft 11 in (1.80 m)
- Listed weight: 146 lb (66 kg)

Career information
- WNBA draft: 2011: undrafted
- Playing career: 2007–present

Career history
- 2007–present: USK Praha

Career highlights
- Euroleague champion (2015); FIBA Europe SuperCup champion (2015); FIBA Europe SuperCup MVP (2015); 6x Czech Women's Basketball League champion (2009, 2011–2015); Euroleague All-Star (2011); All-Euroleague Second Team (2011)

Kateřina Elhotová (Czech pronunciation: [ˈkatɛr̝ɪna ˈɛlɦotovaː]; born 14 October 1989) is a Czech basketball player currently playing for USK Praha of the Czech Women's Basketball League.

== Career ==
Elhotova joined USK Praha in 2007. She was part of the 2013-14 Prague team who went the entire season unbeaten (41 wins) and the team that won the Euroleague in 2015. She won the FIBA Europe SuperCup with Praha, scoring 32 points against Castors Braine and, in the final against UMMC Ekaterinburg, 16 points, 3 rebounds, 2 assists and one steal. She was named MVP of the tournament.

Elhotova was signed by the Minnesota Lynx of the WNBA on 25 February 2016

=== International ===
Elhotova made her international debut at the 2004 European Under-16 Championship. In 2007, she played at the FIBA Under-19 World Championship for Women and Eurobasket. She has played for the Czech Republic at Eurobasket 2007 through to 2015. She played at the World Championships in 2010, (winning the silver medal) and 2014 and at the 2008 and 2012 Summer Olympics, both times reaching the tournament's quarter finals.
