= Marielle Amant =

French basketball player

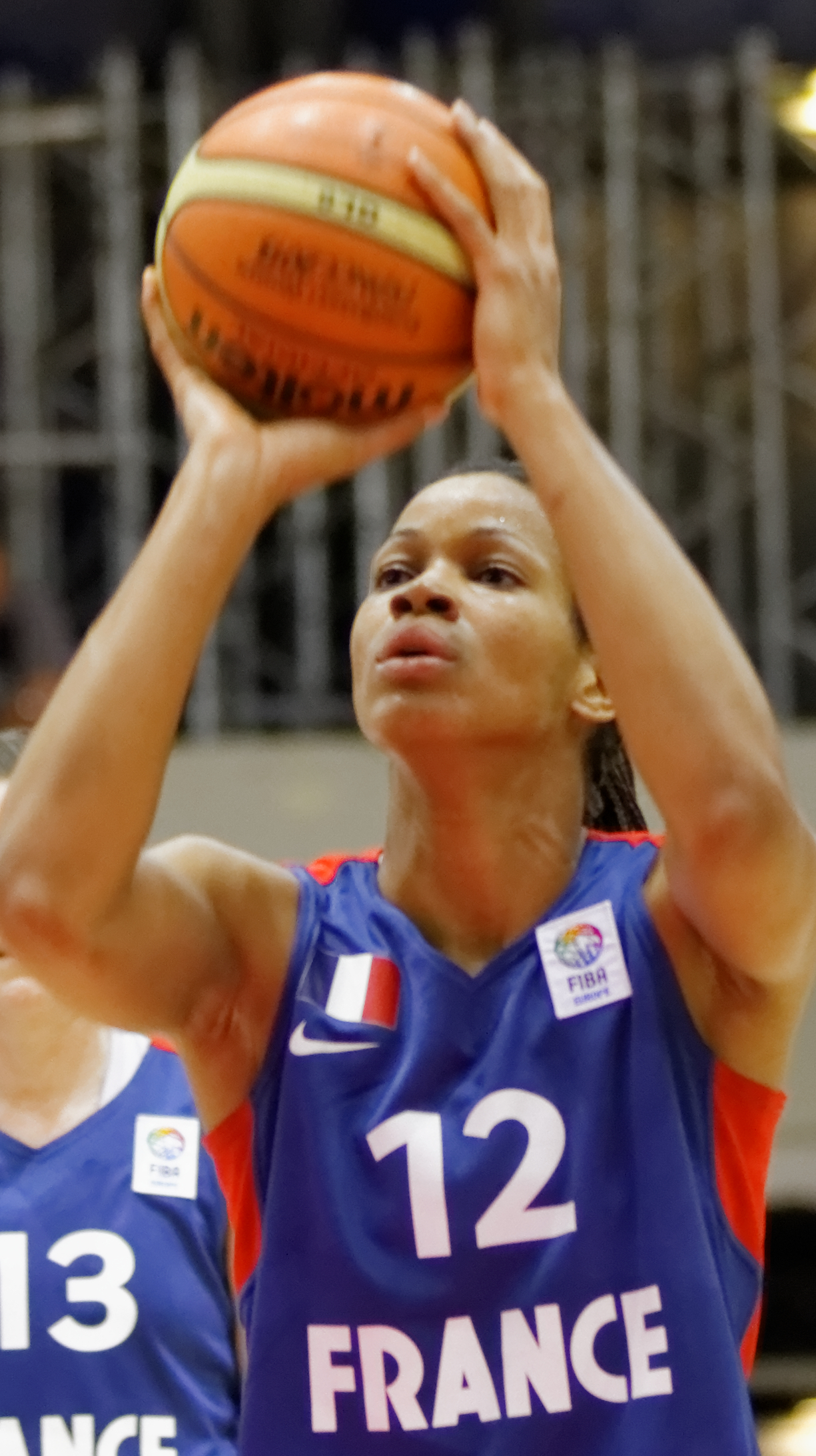
- Amant in 2013

No. 25 – ESB Villeneuve-d’Ascq
- Position: Center
- League: LFB

Personal information
- Born: 9 December 1989 (age 36) Le Lamentin, Martinique
- Listed height: 6 ft 3 in (1.91 m)

Marielle Amant (born 9 December 1989) is a French basketball player for ESB Villeneuve-d’Ascq and the French national team, where she participated at the 2014 FIBA World Championship.
