= Jennifer Digbeu =

French basketball player

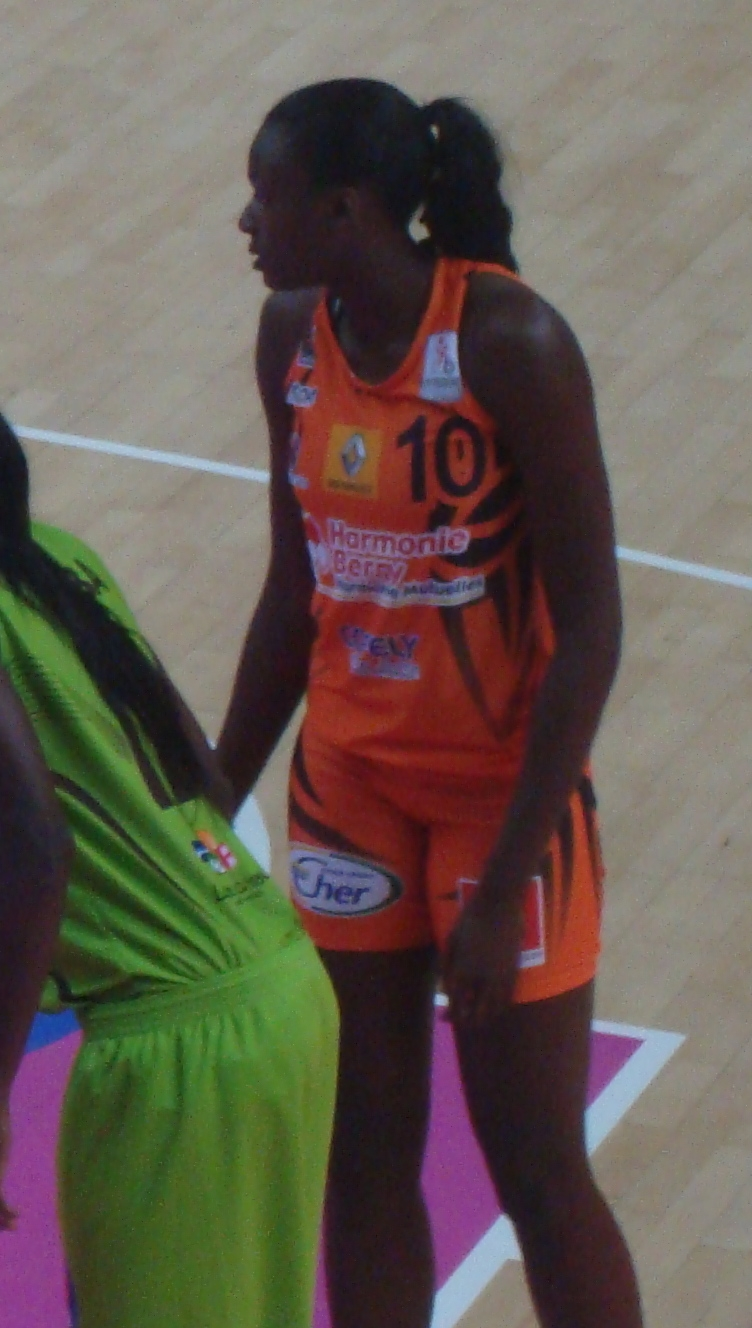

Medal record

Women's Basketball

Representing France

Olympic Games
Silver medal – second place	2012 London	Team

EuroBasket
Bronze medal – third place	2011 Poland	Team

Jennifer Digbeu (born 14 April 1987 in Lyon, France) is a French basketball player who has played 56 times for the French women's national basketball team since her debut against Turkey in 2008. She was part of the French team that won the silver medal at the 2012 Summer Olympics. Jennifer's brother Alain Digbeu is also a basketball player.

She currently plays for the ESB Villeneuve-d'Ascq team.
