= Eva Vítečková =

Czech basketball player

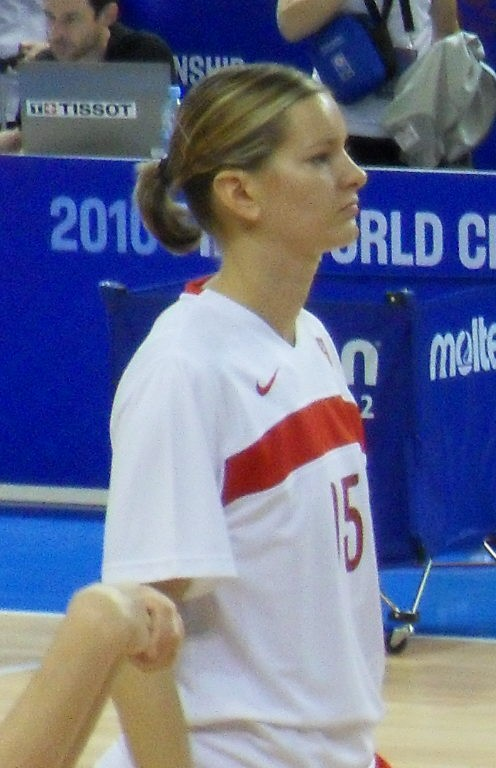

ZVVZ USK Prague
- Position: Forward
- League: ZBL

Personal information
- Born: January 26, 1982 (age 44) Žďár nad Sázavou, Czechoslovakia
- Listed height: 6 ft 3 in (1.91 m)
Medals
World Championships
Silver medal – second place	2010 Czech Republic	Team
European Championships
Gold medal – first place	2005 Turkey	Team
Silver medal – second place	2003 Greece	Team

Eva Vítečková (Czech pronunciation: [ˈɛva ˈviːtɛtʃkovaː]; born 26 January 1982) is a Czech basketball player who competed in the 2004 Summer Olympics, the 2008 Summer Olympics and the 2012 Summer Olympics.
