= Marion Laborde =

French basketball player

Medal record

Women's basketball

Representing France

Olympic Games
| Silver medal – second place | 2012 London | Team |

EuroBasket
| Bronze medal – third place | 2011 Poland | Team |

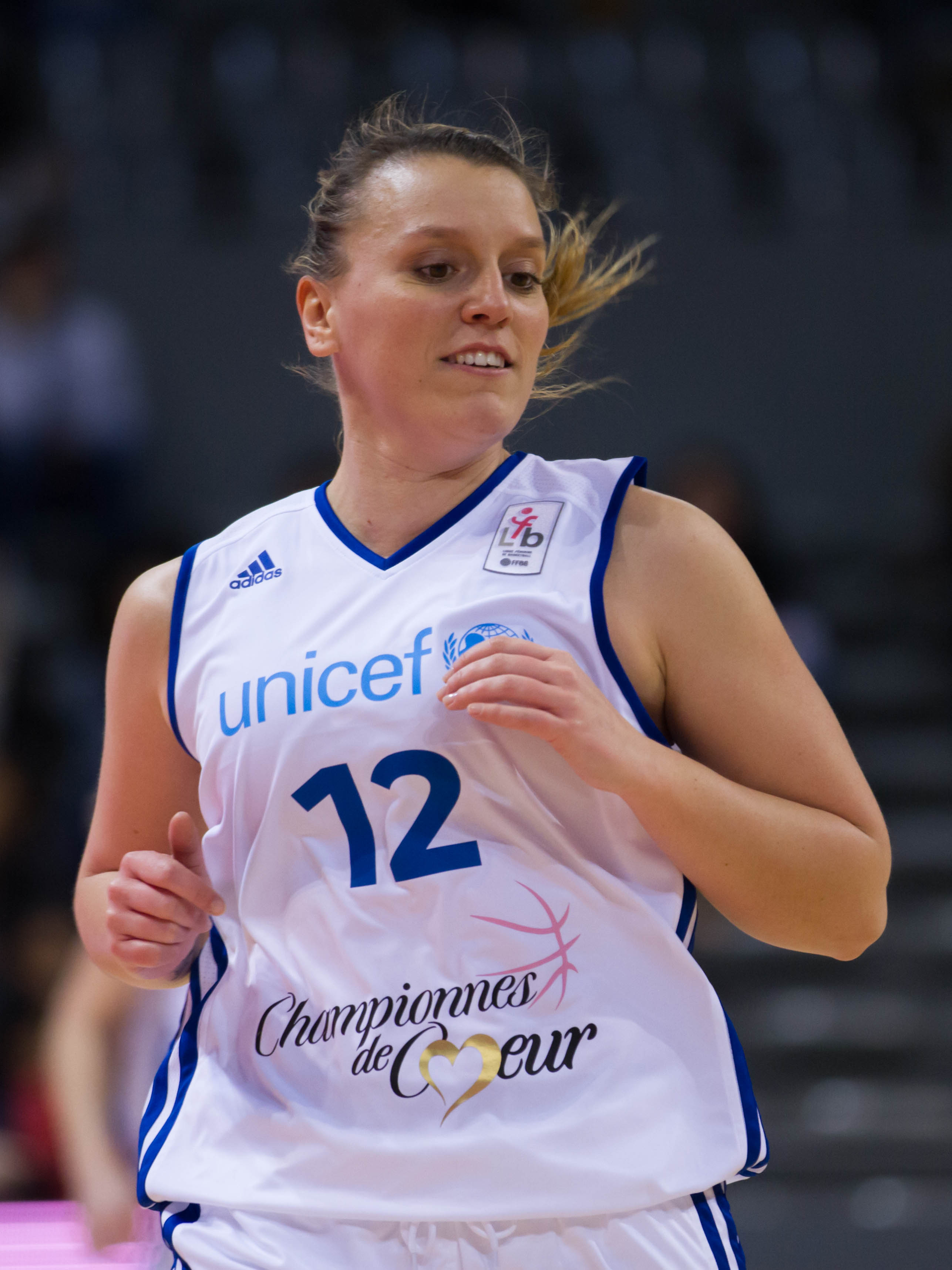
Marion Laborde

Marion Laborde (born 9 December 1986, Dax) is a French professional basketball player. She plays for France women's national basketball team. She has competed in the 2012 Summer Olympics, winning the silver medal. She is 1.78 m (5 ft 10 in) tall.
