= Teresa Gabriele =

Canadian basketball player

Teresa Gabriele (born 1979) is a retired Canadian professional basketball player. She plays for Canada women's national basketball team. She has competed in both the 2000 and the 2012 Summer Olympics. She is 1.65 m (5 ft 5 in) tall.

== Early life and education ==
Gabriele was born in Mission, British Columbia and developed her basketball skills from a young age. She attended Simon Fraser University (SFU), where she played for the SFU Clan women's basketball team. During her collegiate career, she led the team to three national championship games, securing the program's first Canadian Interuniversity Sport (CIS) national championship in 2002 with a perfect 35-0 record.

In the 2002 CIS national championship game, SFU defeated Laval 66-51, and Gabriele was named the tournament MVP. That same season, she set a school record by scoring 45 points in a single game against Trinity Western.

== Professional career ==
After her collegiate success, Gabriele played professionally in Austria and Spain.

== National team contributions ==
Gabriele joined the Canadian women's national basketball team in 1998 and remained a key player until her retirement in 2012. She made her Olympic debut at the 2000 Summer Olympics in Sydney, where Canada finished in tenth place. After a brief retirement, she returned to compete in the 2012 Summer Olympics in London, helping Canada reach the quarter-finals for the first time in program history, ultimately finishing eighth.

== Post-retirement and legacy ==
In recognition of her contributions to the sport, she was inducted into the Simon Fraser University Athletics Hall of Fame in 2013.
