= Krista Phillips =

Canadian former basketball centre (born 1988)

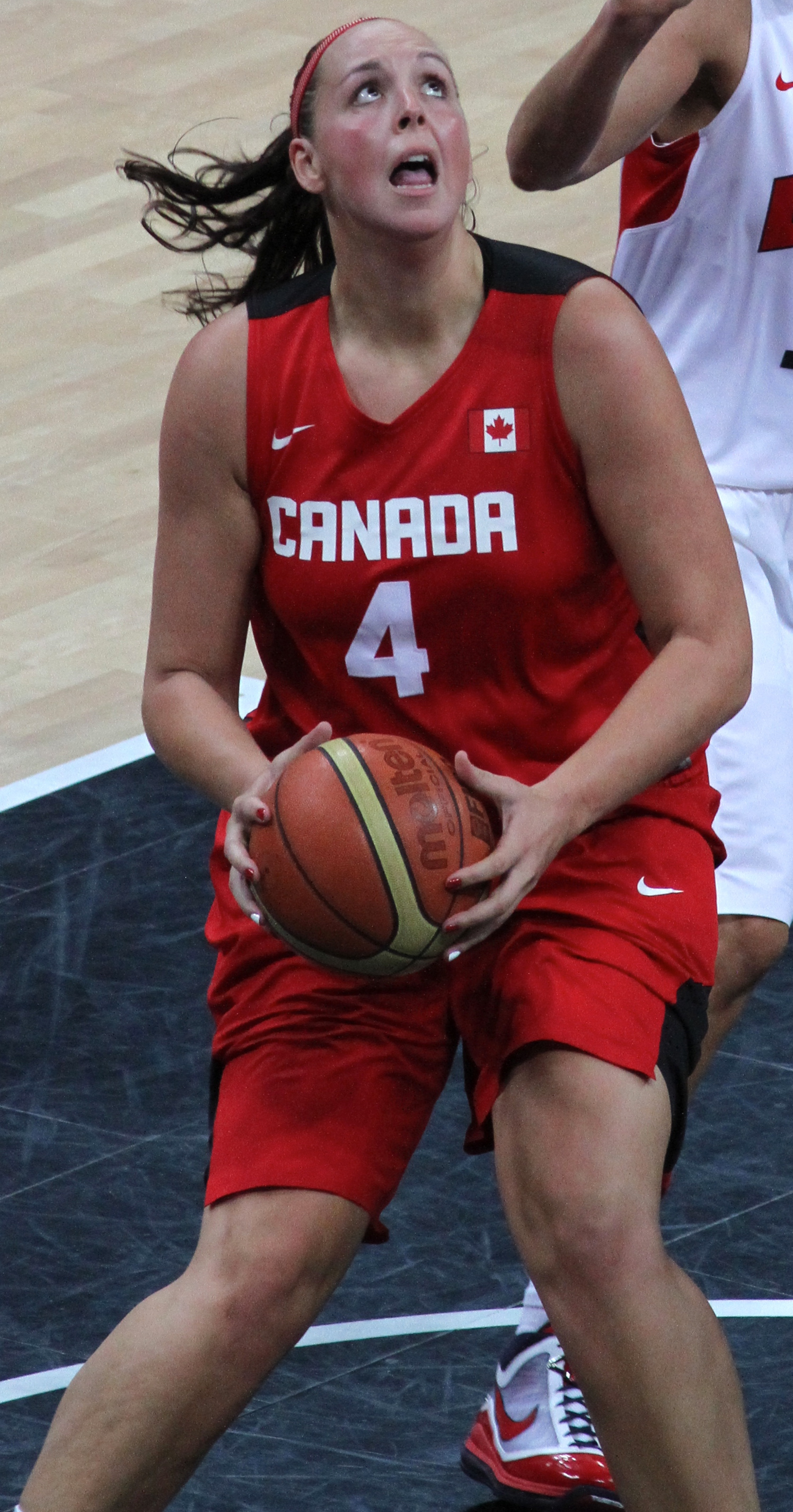
- Phillips at the 2012 Summer Olympics

Personal information
- Born: May 18, 1988 (age 38) Saskatoon, Saskatchewan, Canada
- Listed height: 6 ft 6 in (1.98 m)

Career information
- High school: Aden Bowman Collegiate (Saskatoon, Saskatchewan)
- College: Michigan (2006–2010)
- WNBA draft: 2010: undrafted
- Position: Center
- Number: 25

Krista Lynn Phillips (born May 18, 1988) is a Canadian former basketball centre, who last played for the Dandenong Rangers of the Australian WNBL.

== Career ==
=== Michigan Wolverines ===
In her junior year at University of Michigan, Phillips earned her third varsity letter. She played in all 30 games with seven starts and averaged 18.9 minutes per game. She ranked second on the team in blocks with 28 (0.89 per game) and scored in double figures in six games. During the season, she posted her 100th career block; and became one of six Wolverines with 100-plus career blocks. At season's end, she ranked 19th in the Big Ten in rebounding, averaging 5.2 rebounds per game. Some of the highlights of her season included:

- Tallied a season-high six blocks in the season-opener at Kentucky (November 15).
- Played a season-best 35 minutes against Texas A&M (November 20).
- Lone Wolverine to post double figure rebounds on the season with 10 against North Carolina State (December 5) and 11 at Purdue (February 26).
- She scored a season-high 16 points against Iowa (January 26).
- Was 5-of-5 from the floor against Penn State (February 9).
- Posted a season-high 11 rebounds against Purdue (February 26).
- Recorded Michigan's lone double-double of the season with 10 points and 11 rebounds against Purdue (February 26).

=== Michigan statistics ===
Legend
GP	Games played	GS	Games started	MPG	Minutes per game
FG%	Field goal percentage	3P%	3-point field goal percentage	FT%	Free throw percentage
RPG	Rebounds per game	APG	Assists per game	SPG	Steals per game
BPG	Blocks per game	PPG	Points per game	**Bold**	Career high

Year	Team	GP	Points	FG%	3P%	FT%	RPG	APG	SPG	BPG	PPG
2006-07	Michigan	29	231	46.5%	40.0%	63.1%	4.3	0.3	0.6	1.3	8.0
2007-08	Michigan	33	341	**46.8%**	26.4%	59.5%	5.8	1.0	0.6	1.4	**10.3**
2008-09	Michigan	30	176	42.1%	20.8%	**65.6%**	5.2	1.0	0.5	1.0	5.9
2009-10	Michigan	**35**	**342**	43.5%	**42.1%**	61.4%	**6.7**	**1.2**	**0.8**	**1.8**	9.8
Career		127	1090	44.9%	32.9%	61.8%	5.6	0.9	0.6	1.4	8.6

=== Team Canada ===
- She was a two-year member of Canada's Junior National Team (2005–06). At the 2006 FIBA Americas Under-18 World Championship Qualification Tournament in Colorado Springs, Colorado, she was part of a silver medal winning team. At the tournament, she averaged 5.8 points and 4.3 rebounds in four games.
- At the 2005 FIBA Under-19 World Championship in Tunisia, she averaged 8.7 points, a team-high 7.4 rebounds and 1.1 blocks in seven games. She was an alternate on Canada's 2004 Junior National Team.

From 2001-2005, she was a four-year member of Team Saskatchewan. At the 2005 Canada Summer Games, she led Team Saskatchewan to a fifth-place finish.

- Of note, she played with former Michigan Wolverine teammate Stephany Skrba on Canada's Junior National Team in 2005.

=== WNBL ===
Phillips signed with the Dandenong Rangers of Australia's WNBL for the 2011/12 season. One of her teammates was LA Sparks guard Jenna O'Hea.

=== Olympic Games ===
Krista was part of Team Canada during the London 2012 Summer Olympics.

== Career stats ==
Season	Team	Games Played	Games Started	Minutes	Field Goals	Three Points	Free Throws	'Rebounds	Assists	Blocks	Steals	Points'
2006-07	Michigan Wolverines	29	21	547	86	6	53	126	10	37	17	231
2007-08	Michigan Wolverines	33	26	726	140	14	47	190	34	46	19	341
2008-09	Michigan Wolverines	30	7	566	75	5	21	155	29	31	14	176
2009-10	Michigan Wolverines											

== Personal ==
Her sister Sara, was a junior on the University of Rhode Island's volleyball team.
