= Florence Lepron =

French basketball player

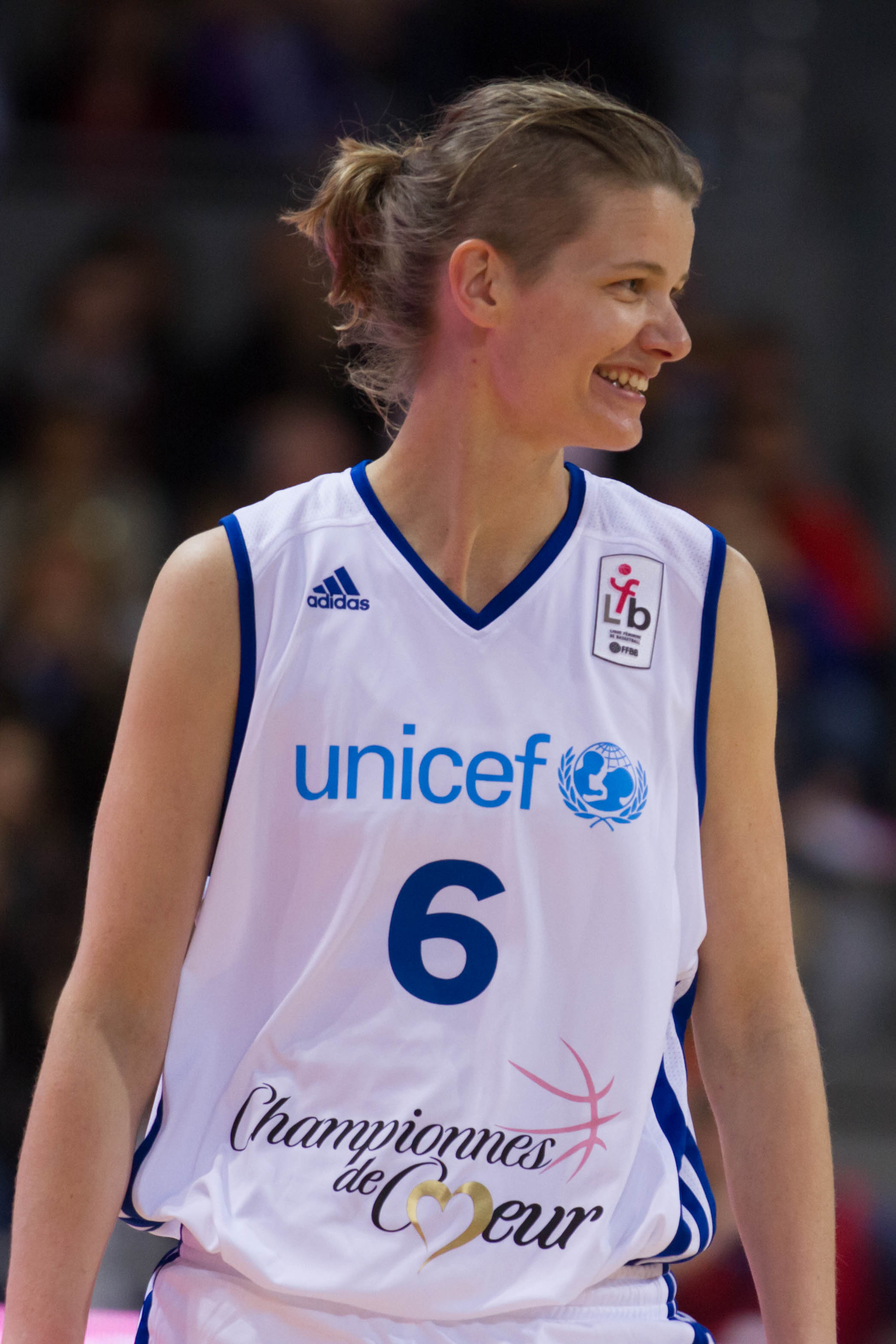

Medal record

Women's basketball

Representing France

Olympic Games
| Silver medal – second place | 2012 London | Team |

EuroBasket
| Gold medal – first place | 2009 Latvia | Team |
| Bronze medal – third place | 2011 Poland | Team |

Florence Lepron (born 16 January 1985) is a French professional basketball player. She plays for France women's national basketball team. She has competed in the 2012 Summer Olympics where France won the silver medal. She is 1.82 m (6 ft 0 in) tall.
