= Emmeline Ndongue =

French basketball player (born 1983)

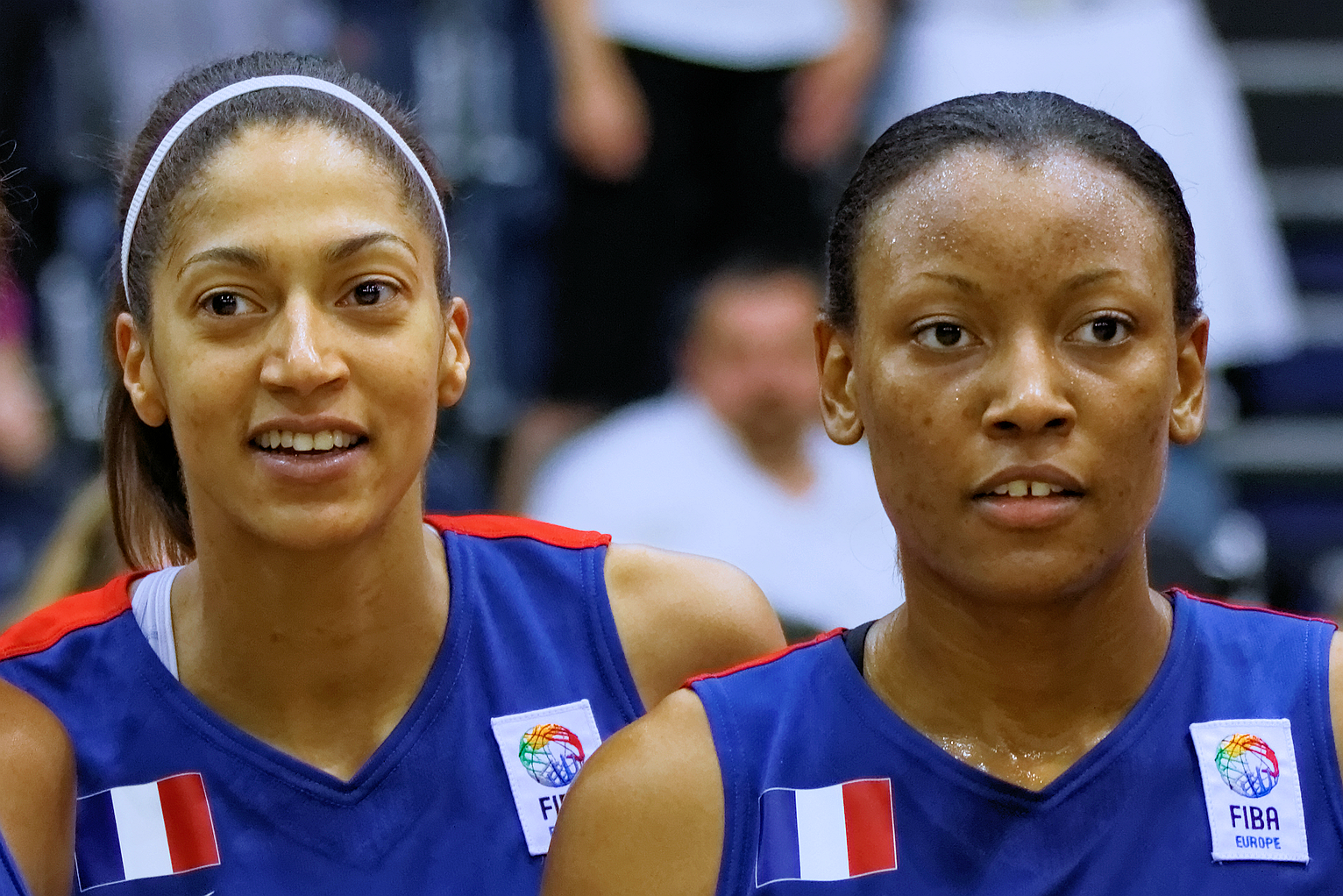
- Ndongue (left) with Diandra Tchatchouang in 2013

Medal record

Women's basketball

Representing France

Olympic Games
Silver medal – second place	2012 London	Team

EuroBasket
Gold medal – first place	2009 Latvia	Team
Silver medal – second place	2013 France	Team
Bronze medal – third place	2011 Poland	Team

Emmeline Ndongue (born 25 April 1983 in Auxerre, France) is a French basketball player who played 196 games for the women's French national basketball team between 2002 and 2013 . She was inducted into the French Basketball Hall of Fame in 2020.
