= France at the 2012 Summer Olympics =

- IOC code: FRA
- NOC: French National Olympic and Sports Committee
- Website: www.franceolympique.com (in French)

in London 27 July 2012 – 12 August 2012
- Competitors: 330 in 24 sports
- Flag bearer: Laura Flessel-Colovic
- Medals Ranked 7th: Gold 11 Silver 11 Bronze 13 Total 35

Summer Olympics appearances (overview)
- 1896; 1900; ~~1904~~; 1908; 1912; 1920; 1924; 1928; 1932; 1936; 1948; 1952; 1956; 1960; 1964; 1968; 1972; 1976; 1980; 1984; 1988; 1992; 1996; 2000; 2004; 2008; 2012; 2016; 2020; 2024; 2028

Other related appearances
- 1906 Intercalated Games

France competed at the 2012 Summer Olympics in London, between 27 July and 12 August 2012. French athletes have competed in every Summer Olympic Games of the modern era. The French Olympic Committee sent a total of 330 athletes to the Games, 183 men and 147 women, to compete in 24 sports.

France left London with a total of 35 medals—11 gold, 11 silver, and 13 bronze—finishing seventh in the gold medal standings and eighth in the overall medal standings. Most of these medals were awarded to the athletes in judo, cycling, and swimming. Six French athletes won more than a single Olympic medal in London. France's team-based athletes proved successful at these games, as the men's national handball team and the women's national basketball team won gold and silver medals, respectively. Furthermore, the men's national handball team managed to defend its 2008 Olympic title from Beijing. For the first time since 1960, France did not win an Olympic medal in fencing.

Among the nation's medalists were Yannick Agnel and Camille Muffat (retired in 2014 and killed tragically in a helicopter crash one year later), who emerged as France's most successful Olympic swimmers after winning three medals, including a gold, in their events. Meanwhile, Florent Manaudou succeeded his sister Laure with an Olympic gold medal in freestyle swimming. Renaud Lavillenie set a new Olympic record in the pole vault, becoming the third French man to claim the title, and the first to do so since 1996. Tony Estanguet won his third gold medal in the men's slalom canoeing singles, making him one of the most successful French athletes in Olympic history. On 11 August 2012, Estanguet was elected to the IOC Athletes' Commission, along with three other athletes. He would then go on to head the Paris Organising Committee for the 2024 Olympic and Paralympic Games.

== Medalists ==
Medal	Name	Sport	Event	Date
Gold	Camille Muffat	Swimming	Women's 400 m freestyle	29 July
Gold	Amaury Leveaux; Fabien Gilot; Clément Lefert; Yannick Agnel; Alain Bernard^{[1]} Jérémy Stravius^{[1]}	Swimming	Men's 4 × 100 m freestyle relay	29 July
Gold	Yannick Agnel	Swimming	Men's 200 m freestyle	30 July
Gold	Tony Estanguet	Canoeing	Men's slalom C-1	31 July
Gold	Lucie Décosse	Judo	Women's 70 kg	1 August
Gold	Émilie Fer	Canoeing	Women's slalom K-1	2 August
Gold	Teddy Riner	Judo	Men's +100 kg	3 August
Gold	Florent Manaudou	Swimming	Men's 50 m freestyle	3 August
Gold	Renaud Lavillenie	Athletics	Men's pole vault	10 August
Gold	Julie Bresset	Cycling	Women's cross-country	11 August
Gold	France national men's handball team: Jérôme Fernandez; Didier Dinart; Xavier Barachet; Guillaume Gille; Bertrand Gille; Daniel Narcisse; Guillaume Joli; Samuel Honrubia; Daouda Karaboué; Nikola Karabatić; Thierry Omeyer; William Accambray; Luc Abalo; Cédric Sorhaindo; Michaël Guigou	Handball	Men's tournament	12 August
Silver	Céline Goberville	Shooting	Women's 10 m air pistol	29 July
Silver	Camille Muffat	Swimming	Women's 200 m freestyle	31 July
Silver	Amaury Leveaux; Grégory Mallet; Clément Lefert; Yannick Agnel; Jérémy Stravius^{[1]}	Swimming	Men's 4 × 200 m freestyle relay	31 July
Silver	Grégory Baugé; Michaël D'Almeida; Kévin Sireau	Cycling	Men's team sprint	2 August
Silver	Germain Chardin; Dorian Mortelette	Rowing	Men's coxless pair	3 August
Silver	Michaël Llodra; Jo-Wilfried Tsonga	Tennis	Men's doubles	4 August
Silver	Bryan Coquard	Cycling	Men's omnium	5 August
Silver	Mahiedine Mekhissi-Benabbad	Athletics	Men's 3000 m steeplechase	5 August
Silver	Grégory Baugé	Cycling	Men's sprint	6 August
Silver	Anne-Caroline Graffe	Taekwondo	Women's +67 kg	11 August
Silver	France women's national basketball team: Isabelle Yacoubou; Endéné Miyem; Clémence Beikes; Sandrine Gruda; Edwige Lawson-Wade; Céline Dumerc; Florence Lepron; Émilie Gomis; Marion Laborde; Élodie Godin; Emmeline Ndongue; Jennifer Digbeu	Basketball	Women's tournament	11 August
Bronze	Priscilla Gneto	Judo	Women's 52 kg	29 July
Bronze	Automne Pavia	Judo	Women's 57 kg	30 July
Bronze	Ugo Legrand	Judo	Men's 73 kg	30 July
Bronze	Gévrise Émane	Judo	Women's 63 kg	31 July
Bronze	Coralie Balmy; Charlotte Bonnet; Ophélie-Cyrielle Étienne; Camille Muffat; Margaux Farrell^{[1]} Mylène Lazare^{[1]}	Swimming	Women's 4 × 200 m freestyle relay	1 August
Bronze	Audrey Tcheuméo	Judo	Women's 78 kg	2 August
Bronze	Delphine Réau	Shooting	Women's trap	4 August
Bronze	Julien Benneteau; Richard Gasquet	Tennis	Men's doubles	4 August
Bronze	Jonathan Lobert	Sailing	Finn class	5 August
Bronze	Hamilton Sabot	Gymnastics	Men's parallel bars	7 August
Bronze	Steeve Guénot	Wrestling	Men's Greco-Roman 66 kg	7 August
Bronze	Marlène Harnois	Taekwondo	Women's 57 kg	9 August
Bronze	Emmanuel Biron; Christophe Lemaitre; Pierre-Alexis Pessonneaux; Ronald Pognon; Jimmy Vicaut	Athletics	Men's 4 × 100 m relay	11 August

1.^{1} ^{2} ^{3} ^{4} ^{5} Competed in preliminaries but not the final relay.
2.^{2} In May 2014, the US 4 × 100 metres relay team member Tyson Gay received a one-year suspension for anabolic steroid use and was stripped of his medals after 15 July 2012 when he first used. In May 2015, the IOC wrote to US Olympic Committee telling them to collect the medals from teammates Trell Kimmons, Justin Gatlin, Ryan Bailey, Jeffery Demps and Darvis Patton. Two of Gay's teammates who ran with him in the final, Kimmons and Bailey, had previously also served suspensions. The medals were reallocated, with Trinidad and Tobago awarded silver, and France taking bronze.

Medals by sport
Sport	1st place, gold medalist(s)	2nd place, silver medalist(s)	3rd place, bronze medalist(s)	Total
Swimming	4	2	1	7
Judo	2	0	5	7
Canoeing	2	0	0	2
Cycling	1	3	0	4
Athletics	1	1	1	3
Handball	1	0	0	1
Shooting	0	1	1	2
Taekwondo	0	1	1	2
Tennis	0	1	1	2
Basketball	0	1	0	1
Rowing	0	1	0	1
Sailing	0	0	1	1
Gymnastics	0	0	1	1
Wrestling	0	0	1	1
Total	11	11	13	35

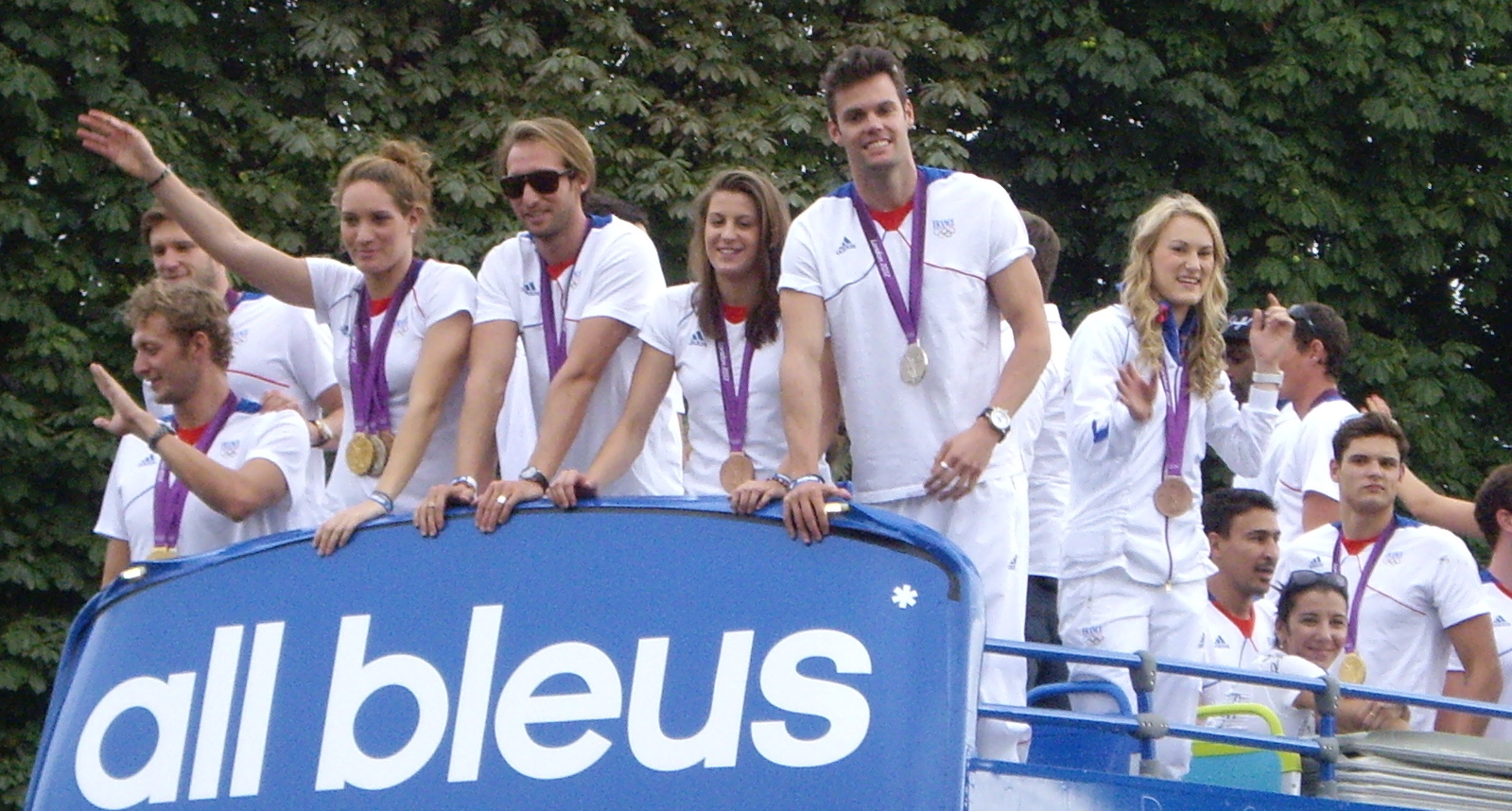
Returning French medallists greeted on the Champs-Élysées on 13 August 2012.

== Delegation ==
The French Olympic Committee selected a team of 330 athletes, 183 men and 147 women, to compete in 24 different sports; it was the nation's third largest team outside the host nation, and the first with the highest percentage of women in Olympic history. France did not qualify teams in field hockey, volleyball and water polo, but did mark its Olympic return to men's basketball after a twelve-year absence.

The French team included past Olympic champions, three of them defending (Greco-Roman wrestler Steeve Guenot, mountain biker Julien Absalon, and the men's national handball team). Equestrian eventing rider Denis Mesples, at age 49, was the oldest athlete of the team, while gymnast Anne Kuhm was the youngest, at age 15. Pistol shooter and former Olympic gold medalist Franck Dumoulin made his sixth appearance, having participated at every Summer Olympics since 1992. Épée fencer and multiple-time Olympic medalist Laura Flessel-Colovic, meanwhile, became the first French female athlete to compete at five separate Olympic Games. Because of her repeated successes in fencing, Flessel-Colovic became France's first female flag bearer at the opening ceremony since 1996.

Other notable French athletes included slalom canoer and multiple-time world champion Tony Estanguet, judoka and Olympic bronze medalist Teddy Riner, swimmer and junior European champion Yannick Agnel, pole vaulter and multiple-time European champion Renaud Lavillenie, and basketballer Tony Parker, who had previously played for the NBA's San Antonio Spurs.

The following table lists the number of French competitors who participated in each Olympic sport. Note that reserves in fencing, field hockey, football, and handball are not counted as athletes.

Sport	Men	Women	Total
Archery	3	1	4
Athletics	31	21	52
Badminton	1	1	2
Basketball	12	12	24
Boxing	5	0	5
Canoeing	9	5	14
Cycling	14	9	23
Diving	2	3	5
Equestrian	8	2	10
Fencing	6	5	11
Football	0	18	18
Gymnastics	6	6	12
Handball	14	14	28
Judo	7	7	14
Modern pentathlon	1	2	3
Rowing	14	0	14
Sailing	9	7	16
Shooting	8	6	14
Swimming	18	13	31
Synchronized swimming	0	2	2
Table tennis	1	2	3
Taekwondo	0	2	2
Tennis	5	2	7
Triathlon	3	3	6
Weightlifting	3	1	4
Wrestling	5	1	6
Total	183	147	330

== Archery ==
France qualified three archers for the men's individual event, an archer for the women's individual event and a team for the men's team event:

Athlete	Event	Ranking round		Round of 64	Round of 32	Round of 16	Quarterfinals	Semifinals	Final / BM	
Athlete	Event	Score	Seed	Opposition Score	Opposition Score	Opposition Score	Opposition Score	Opposition Score	Opposition Score	Rank
Thomas Faucheron	Men's individual	665	27	Thamwong (THA) (38); W 6–0	Prévost (FRA) (27); L 3–7	Did not advance				
Romain Girouille	Men's individual	677	9	Myo Aung (MYA) (56); L 5–6	Did not advance					
Gaël Prévost	Men's individual	679	6	Kouassi (CIV) (59); W 6–3	Faucheron (FRA) (27); W 7–3	Ruban (UKR) (43); L 4–6	Did not advance			
Thomas Faucheron; Romain Girouille; Gaël Prévost	Men's team	2021	2	—N/a		Bye	Mexico (7); L 212–220	Did not advance		
Bérengère Schuh	Women's individual	640	37	Kawanaka (JPN) (28); W 6–2	Lin C-E (TPE) (5); W 6–5	Choi H-j (KOR) (21); W 6–5	Lorig (USA) (4); L 6–2	Did not advance		

== Athletics ==
French athletes achieved qualifying standards in the following athletics events (up to a maximum of 3 athletes in each event at the 'A' Standard, and 1 at the 'B' Standard):

Key

- Note–Ranks given for track events are within the athlete's heat only
- Q = Qualified for the next round
- q = Qualified for the next round as a fastest loser or, in field events, by position without achieving the qualifying target
- NR = National record
- N/A = Round not applicable for the event
- Bye = Athlete not required to compete in round

Men
Track & road events

Athlete	Event	Heat		Quarterfinal		Semifinal		Final	
Athlete	Event	Result	Rank	Result	Rank	Result	Rank	Result	Rank
Jamale Aarrass	1500 m	3:45.13	12	—N/a		Did not advance			
Dimitri Bascou	110 m hurdles	13.57	4 q	—N/a		13.55	6	Did not advance	
Pierre-Ambroise Bosse	800 m	1:46.03	4 q	—N/a		1:45.10	4	Did not advance	
Florian Carvalho	1500 m	3:37.05	7 q	—N/a		3:40.61	13	Did not advance	
Garfield Darien	110 m hurdles	13.54	4 q	—N/a		13.48	5	Did not advance	
Yohann Diniz	50 km walk	—N/a						DSQ	
Ladji Doucouré	110 m hurdles	13.67	4 q	—N/a		13.74	8	Did not advance	
Hassan Hirt	5000 m	DSQ*		—N/a				Did not advance	
Cédric Houssaye	50 km walk	—N/a						3:55:16	31
Abraham Kiprotich	Marathon	—N/a						DNF	
Yoann Kowal	1500 m	3:41.12	3 Q	—N/a		3:43.48	8	Did not advance	
Christophe Lemaitre	200 m	20.34	1 Q	—N/a		20.03	3 q	20.19	6
Abdellatif Meftah	Marathon	—N/a						DNF	
Mahiedine Mekhissi-Benabbad	3000 m steeplechase	8:16.23	1 Q	—N/a				8:19.08	2nd place, silver medalist(s)
Bertrand Moulinet	20 km walk	—N/a						1:20:12	8
Bertrand Moulinet	50 km walk	—N/a						3:45:35	12
Patrick Tambwé	Marathon	—N/a						DNF	
Jimmy Vicaut	100 m	Bye		10.11	2 Q	10.16	6	Did not advance	
Vincent Zouaoui-Dandrieux	3000 m steeplechase	8:36.96	8	—N/a				Did not advance	
Emmanuel Biron; Christophe Lemaitre; Pierre-Alexis Pessonneaux; Ronald Pognon; Jimmy Vicaut	4 × 100 m relay	38.15	4	—N/a				38.16	3rd place, bronze medalist(s)

* Tested positive for the blood-booster EPO; the IOC ordered him to leave the Olympics on 10 August 2012.

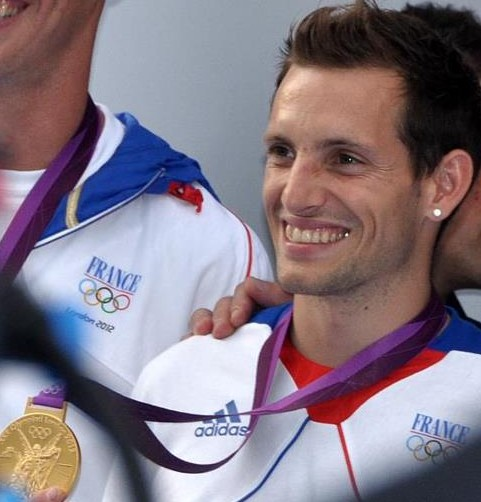
Renaud Lavillenie displayed his gold medal in men's pole vault.

Field events

Athlete	Event	Qualification		Final	
Athlete	Event	Distance	Position	Distance	Position
Quentin Bigot	Hammer throw	72.42	24	Did not advance	
Jérôme Bortoluzzi	Hammer throw	74.15	14	Did not advance	
Benjamin Compaoré	Triple jump	17.06	3 q	17.08	6
Nicolas Figère	Hammer throw	69.74	32	Did not advance	
Mickaël Hanany	High jump	2.26	=8 q	2.20	14
Renaud Lavillenie	Pole vault	5.65	=1 q	5.97 OR	1st place, gold medalist(s)
Romain Mesnil	Pole vault	5.60	6 q	5.50	10
Salim Sdiri	Long jump	7.71	23	Did not advance	

Combined events – Decathlon

Athlete	Event	100 m	LJ	SP	HJ	400 m	110H	DT	PV	JT	1500 m	Final	Rank
Kevin Mayer	Result	11.32	7.17	14.05	2.05	48.76	15.59	41.20	4.70	62.41	4:23.02	7952	15
Kevin Mayer	Points	791	854	731	850	873	780	689	819	774	791	7952	15

Women
Track & road events

Athlete	Event	Heat		Quarterfinal		Semifinal		Final	
Athlete	Event	Result	Rank	Result	Rank	Result	Rank	Result	Rank
Véronique Mang	100 m	Bye		11.41	6	Did not advance			
Reïna-Flor Okori	100 m hurdles	13.01	2 Q	—N/a		DSQ		Did not advance	
Myriam Soumaré	100 m	Bye		11.07	2 Q	11.13	5	Did not advance	
Myriam Soumaré	200 m	22.70	2 Q	—N/a		22.56	3 q	22.63	7
Nelly Banco; Johanna Danois; Ayodelé Ikuesan; Lina Jacques-Sébastien; Véronique Mang; Myriam Soumaré	4 × 100 m relay	DSQ		—N/a				Did not advance	
Phara Anacharsis; Elea-Mariama Diarra; Marie Gayot; Floria Gueï; Lénora Guion-Firmin; Muriel Hurtis-Houairi	4 × 400 m relay	3:25.94	3 Q	—N/a				3:25.92	6

Field events

Athlete	Event	Qualification		Final	
Athlete	Event	Distance	Position	Distance	Position
Vanessa Boslak	Pole vault	4.55	=7 q	4.30	10
Stéphanie Falzon	Hammer throw	71.67	11 q	73.06	9
Éloyse Lesueur	Long jump	6.48	10 q	6.67	8
Marion Lotout	Pole vault	4.10	=33	Did not advance	
Melanie Melfort	High jump	1.93	=2 q	1.93	9
Mélina Robert-Michon	Discus throw	62.47	12 q	63.98	6

Combined events – Heptathlon

Athlete	Event	100H	HJ	SP	200 m	LJ	JT	800 m	Final	Rank
Marisa De Aniceto	Result	13.74	1.71	13.09	25.26	5.76	51.98	2:16.20	6030	21
Marisa De Aniceto	Points	1015	867	733	863	777	899	876	6030	21
Antoinette Nana Djimou Ida	Result	12.96	1.80	14.26	24.72	6.13	55.87	2:13.62	6576	6
Antoinette Nana Djimou Ida	Points	1130	978	811	913	890	974	912	6576	6

== Badminton ==
Athlete	Event	Group Stage			Elimination	Quarterfinal	Semifinal	Final / BM	
Athlete	Event	Opposition Score	Opposition Score	Rank	Opposition Score	Opposition Score	Opposition Score	Opposition Score	Rank
Brice Leverdez	Men's singles	Wong W K (HKG); L 11–21, 16–21	Ekiring (UGA); W 21–12, 21–11	2	Did not advance				
Pi Hongyan	Women's singles	Hosny (EGY); W 21–11, 21–9	Magee (IRL); W 16–21, 21–18, 21–14	1 Q	Yip P Y (HKG); L 21–13, 12–21, 16–21	Did not advance			

== Basketball ==
The French men's basketball team qualified for the 2012 Olympics by reaching the final of the EuroBasket 2011. The French women's team qualified through the World Qualification Tournament.

- Men's team event – 1 team of 12 players
- Women's team event – 1 team of 12 players

=== Men's tournament ===
Roster

The following is the France roster in the men's basketball tournament of the 2012 Summer Olympics.

France men's national basketball team – 2012 Summer Olympics roster
Players
Coaches

Pos.	No.	Name	Age – Date of birth	Height	Club
C	4	Kevin Séraphin	22 – 7 December 1989	2.06 m (6 ft 9 in)	Washington Wizards
F	5	Nicolas Batum	23 – 14 December 1988	2.03 m (6 ft 8 in)	Portland Trail Blazers
G	6	Fabien Causeur	25 – 16 June 1987	1.93 m (6 ft 4 in)	Caja Laboral
F	7	Yakhouba Diawara	29 – 29 August 1982	2.01 m (6 ft 7 in)	Pallacanestro Varese
F/C	8	Ali Traoré	27 – 28 February 1985	2.08 m (6 ft 10 in)	BC Lokomotiv–Kuban Krasnodar
G	9	Tony Parker	30 – 17 May 1982	1.88 m (6 ft 2 in)	San Antonio Spurs
G	10	Yannick Bokolo	27 – 19 June 1985	1.88 m (6 ft 2 in)	BCM Gravelines
F	11	Florent Piétrus	31 – 19 January 1981	2.02 m (6 ft 8 in)	Valencia BC
G	12	Nando de Colo	25 – 23 June 1987	1.96 m (6 ft 5 in)	San Antonio Spurs
F	13	Boris Diaw	30 – 16 April 1982	2.03 m (6 ft 8 in)	San Antonio Spurs
C	14	Ronny Turiaf	31 – 18 June 1981	2.08 m (6 ft 10 in)	Los Angeles Clippers
F	15	Mickaël Gelabale	29 – 22 May 1983	2.01 m (6 ft 7 in)	BC Khimki

Head coach

- Vincent Collet

Legend

- Club – describes last
  club before the tournament
- Age – describes age
  on 29 July 2012

Group play

Pos	Team	Pld	W	L	PF	PA	PD	Pts	Qualification
1	United States	5	5	0	589	398	+191	10	Quarterfinals
2	France	5	4	1	376	378	−2	9	Quarterfinals
3	Argentina	5	3	2	448	424	+24	8	Quarterfinals
4	Lithuania	5	2	3	395	399	−4	7	Quarterfinals
5	Nigeria	5	1	4	338	456	−118	6	
6	Tunisia	5	0	5	320	411	−91	5	

Source: FIBA archive
Rules for classification: 1) points; 2) head-to-head points; 3) head-to-head goal average; 4) head-to-head number of points scored.

29 July 2012
14:30

Report

United States	98–71	France
Scoring by quarter: 22–21, 30–15, 26–15, 20–20
Pts: Durant 22; Rebs: three players 9 Asts: James 8		Pts: Traoré 12; Rebs: Turiaf 9 Asts: de Colo 3

Basketball Arena, London
Referees: Cristiano Maranho (BRA), Saša Pukl (SLO), Michael Aylen (AUS)

31 July 2012
20:00

Report

France	71–64	Argentina
Scoring by quarter: 19–12, 13–17, 23–24, 16–11
Pts: Parker 17; Rebs: Batum 7 Asts: Parker 5		Pts: Ginóbili 26; Rebs: Scola 8 Asts: Prigioni 8

Basketball Arena, London
Referees: Juan Arteaga (ESP), Marcos Benito (BRA), Luigi Lamonica (ITA)

2 August 2012
09:00

Report

France	82–74	Lithuania
Scoring by quarter: 25–21, 14–22, 20–9, 23–22
Pts: Parker 27; Rebs: Turiaf 10; Asts: Diaw 8		Pts: Kleiza 17; Rebs: Kleiza 7 Asts: Jasikevičius 5

Basketball Arena, London
Referees: Christos Christodoulou (GRE), Ilija Belošević (SRB), Jorge Vázquez (PUR)

4 August 2012
09:00

Report

Tunisia	69–73	France
Scoring by quarter: 15–20, 12–15, 16–25, 26–13
Pts: Hdidane 20; Rebs: Ben Romdhane 8 Asts: Laghnej, Mejri 3		Pts: Parker 22; Rebs: Batum 8 Asts: Diaw 5

Basketball Arena, London
Referees: Guerrino Cerebuch (ITA), Bill Kennedy (USA), Vaughan Mayberry (AUS)

6 August 2012
14:30

Report

France	79–73	Nigeria
Scoring by quarter: 23–10, 18–20, 15–24, 23–19
Pts: Batum 23; Rebs: Batum, Diaw 6 Asts: Parker 7		Pts: Oguchi 35; Rebs: Diogu, A. Aminu 7 Asts: four players 2

Basketball Arena, London
Referees: Recep Ankaralı (TUR), Michael Aylen (AUS), Rabah Noujaim (LIB)

Quarter-final

8 August 2012
16:15

Report

France	59–66	Spain
Scoring by quarter: 22–17, 15–17, 16–17, 6–15
Pts: Parker, Diaw 15; Rebs: Diaw 8 Asts: Diaw 5		Pts: M. Gasol 14; Rebs: P. Gasol 11; Asts: P. Gasol, Fernández 3

North Greenwich Arena, London
Referees: Cristiano Maranho (BRA), Bill Kennedy (USA), Christos Christodoulou (GRE)

=== Women's tournament ===
Roster

The following is the France roster in the women's basketball tournament of the 2012 Summer Olympics.

France women's national basketball team – 2012 Summer Olympics roster
Players
Coaches

Pos.	No.	Name	Age – Date of birth	Height	Club	Ctr.
C	4	Isabelle Yacoubou	26 – 21 April 1986	1.90 m (6 ft 3 in)	Spartak Moscow	(Russia)
C	5	Endéné Miyem	24 – 15 May 1988	1.88 m (6 ft 2 in)	CJM Bourges Basket	(France)
G	6	Clémence Beikes	28 – 19 October 1983	1.80 m (5 ft 11 in)	Union Hainaut	(France)
C	7	Sandrine Gruda	25 – 25 June 1987	1.92 m (6 ft 4 in)	UMMC Ekaterinburg	(Russia)
G	8	Edwige Lawson-Wade	33 – 14 May 1979	1.66 m (5 ft 5 in)	Lattes-Maurin Montpellier	(France)
G	9	Céline Dumerc	30 – 9 July 1982	1.69 m (5 ft 7 in)	CJM Bourges Basket	(France)
G	10	Florence Lepron	27 – 16 January 1985	1.82 m (6 ft 0 in)	Tarbes Gespe Bigorre	(France)
G	11	Émilie Gomis	28 – 18 October 1983	1.78 m (5 ft 10 in)	ESB Villeneuve-d'Ascq	(France)
G	12	Marion Laborde	25 – 9 December 1986	1.78 m (5 ft 10 in)	Basket Landes	(France)
C	13	Élodie Godin	27 – 5 July 1985	1.90 m (6 ft 3 in)	Taranto Cras Basket	(Italy)
C	14	Emmeline Ndongue	29 – 25 April 1983	1.94 m (6 ft 4 in)	CJM Bourges Basket	(France)
F	15	Jennifer Digbeu	25 – 14 April 1987	1.90 m (6 ft 3 in)	ESB Villeneuve-d'Ascq	(France)

Head coach

- (France) Pierre Vincent

Legend

- Club – describes last
  club before the tournament
- Age – describes age
  on 28 July 2012

Group play

Pos	Team	Pld	W	L	PF	PA	PD	Pts	Qualification
1	France	5	5	0	356	319	+37	10	Quarterfinals
2	Australia	5	4	1	353	322	+31	9	Quarterfinals
3	Russia	5	3	2	314	308	+6	8	Quarterfinals
4	Canada	5	2	3	328	332	−4	7	Quarterfinals
5	Brazil	5	1	4	329	354	−25	6	
6	Great Britain (H)	5	0	5	327	372	−45	5	

Source: [ FIBA archive]
Rules for classification: 1) points; 2) head-to-head points; 3) head-to-head goal average; 4) head-to-head number of points scored.
(H) Hosts

28 July 2012
20:00

Report

Brazil	58–73	France
Scoring by quarter: 20–16, 14–18, 15–18, 9–21
Pts: de Souza 17; Rebs: Santos 12; Asts: Pinto 5		Pts: Dumerc 23; Rebs: Miyem 7 Asts: Dumerc 5

Basketball Arena, London
Referees: Robert Lottermoser (GER), Rabah Noujaim (LIB), Felicia Grinter (USA)

30 July 2012
14:30

Report

France	74–70 (OT)	Australia
Scoring by quarter: 11–14, 17–13, 24–24, 13–14, Overtime: 9–5
Pts: Gomis 22; Rebs: Yacoubou 7 Asts: Beikes, Dumerc 2		Pts: Batkovic 17; Rebs: Batkovic 10; Asts: O'Hea 5

Basketball Arena, London
Referees: William Kennedy (USA), Christos Christodoulou (GRE), Peng Ling (CHN)

1 August 2012
09:00

Report

Canada	60–64	France
Scoring by quarter: 12–13, 13–15, 15–14, 20–22
Pts: Thorburn 17; Rebs: Achonwa 8 Asts: Thorburn 3		Pts: Gomis 16; Rebs: Gruda 6 Asts: three players 3

Basketball Arena, London
Referees: Luigi Lamonica (ITA), Pablo Estévez (ARG), Shoko Suguro (JPN)

3 August 2012
20:00

Report

France	80–77 (OT)	Great Britain
Scoring by quarter: 10–13, 17–10, 20–21, 20–23, Overtime: 13–10
Pts: Gruda, Lawson-Wade 16; Rebs: Godin 8 Asts: Godin 4		Pts: Leedham 29; Rebs: Page, Leedham 8 Asts: Page 3

Basketball Arena, London
Referees: Ilija Belošević (SRB), Oļegs Latiševs (LAT), Snehal Bendke (IND)

5 August 2012
09:00

Report

France	65–54	Russia
Scoring by quarter: 10–15, 15–6, 30–13, 10–20
Pts: Dumerc 12; Rebs: Yacoubou, Beikes 7 Asts: Dumerc 3		Pts: Belyakova 14; Rebs: Hammon, Osipova 5 Asts: Danilochkina, Osipova 3

Basketball Arena, London
Referees: Pablo Estévez (ARG), Saša Pukl (SLO), Shoko Sugruro (JPN)

Quarter-final

7 August 2012
22:15

Report

France	71–68	Czech Republic
Scoring by quarter: 16–12, 12–16, 13–23, 30–17
Pts: Dumerc 23; Rebs: Gruda 7 Asts: Dumerc 6		Pts: Vítečková 17; Rebs: Horáková 7 Asts: Horáková 5

Basketball Arena, London
Referees: Marcos Benito (BRA), Felicia Grinter (USA), Rabah Noujaim (LIB)

Semi-final

9 August 2012
21:00

Report

Russia	64–81	France
Scoring by quarter: 15–24, 16–14, 20–21, 13–22
Pts: Danilochkina, Hammon 13; Rebs: Vieru 8 Asts: Hammon 5		Pts: Lawson-Wade 18; Rebs: Gruda 8 Asts: Lawson-Wade 5

North Greenwich Arena, London
Referees: Guerrino Cerebuch (ITA), Jorge Vázquez (PUR), Stephen Seibel (CAN)

Final

11 August 2012
21:00

Report

(gold) United States	86–50	France (silver)
Scoring by quarter: 20–15, 17–10, 26–12, 23–13
Pts: Parker 21; Rebs: Parker 11; Asts: Taurasi 6		Pts: Gruda, Lawson-Wade 12; Rebs: Ndongue 8 Asts: Dumerc 3

North Greenwich Arena, London
Referees: Fernando Sampietro (ARG), Elena Chernova (RUS), Peng Ling (CHN)

== Boxing ==
France qualified boxers in the following events:

Men

Athlete	Event	Round of 32	Round of 16	Quarterfinals	Semifinals	Final	
Athlete	Event	Opposition Result	Opposition Result	Opposition Result	Opposition Result	Opposition Result	Rank
Jérémy Beccu	Light flyweight	Zhakypov (KAZ); L 17–18	Did not advance				
Nordine Oubaali	Flyweight	Faisal (AFG); W 22–9	Warren (USA); W 19–18	Conlan (IRL); L 22–18	Did not advance		
Rachid Azzedine	Lightweight	Ramírez (USA); L 20–21	Did not advance				
Alexis Vastine	Welterweight	Wojcicki (GER); W 16–12	Tüvshinbat (MGL); W 13–12	Shelestyuk (UKR); L 18–18^{+}	Did not advance		
Tony Yoka	Super heavyweight	—N/a	Kean (CAN); L 16–16^{+}	Did not advance			

== Canoeing ==
=== Slalom ===
France qualified boats for all slalom events:

Athlete	Event	Preliminary						Semifinal		Final	
Athlete	Event	Run 1	Rank	Run 2	Rank	Best	Rank	Time	Rank	Time	Rank
Étienne Daille	Men's K-1	90.12	7	241.73	22	90.12	13 Q	100.55	10 Q	101.87	7
Tony Estanguet	Men's C-1	93.24	2	99.20	10	93.24	7 Q	101.67	3 Q	97.06	1st place, gold medalist(s)
Gauthier Klauss; Matthieu Péché	Men's C-2	96.98	1	151.03	12	96.98	1 Q	109.27	3 Q	109.17	4
Émilie Fer	Women's K-1	112.77	12	106.46	8	106.46	10 Q	109.73	3 Q	105.90	1st place, gold medalist(s)

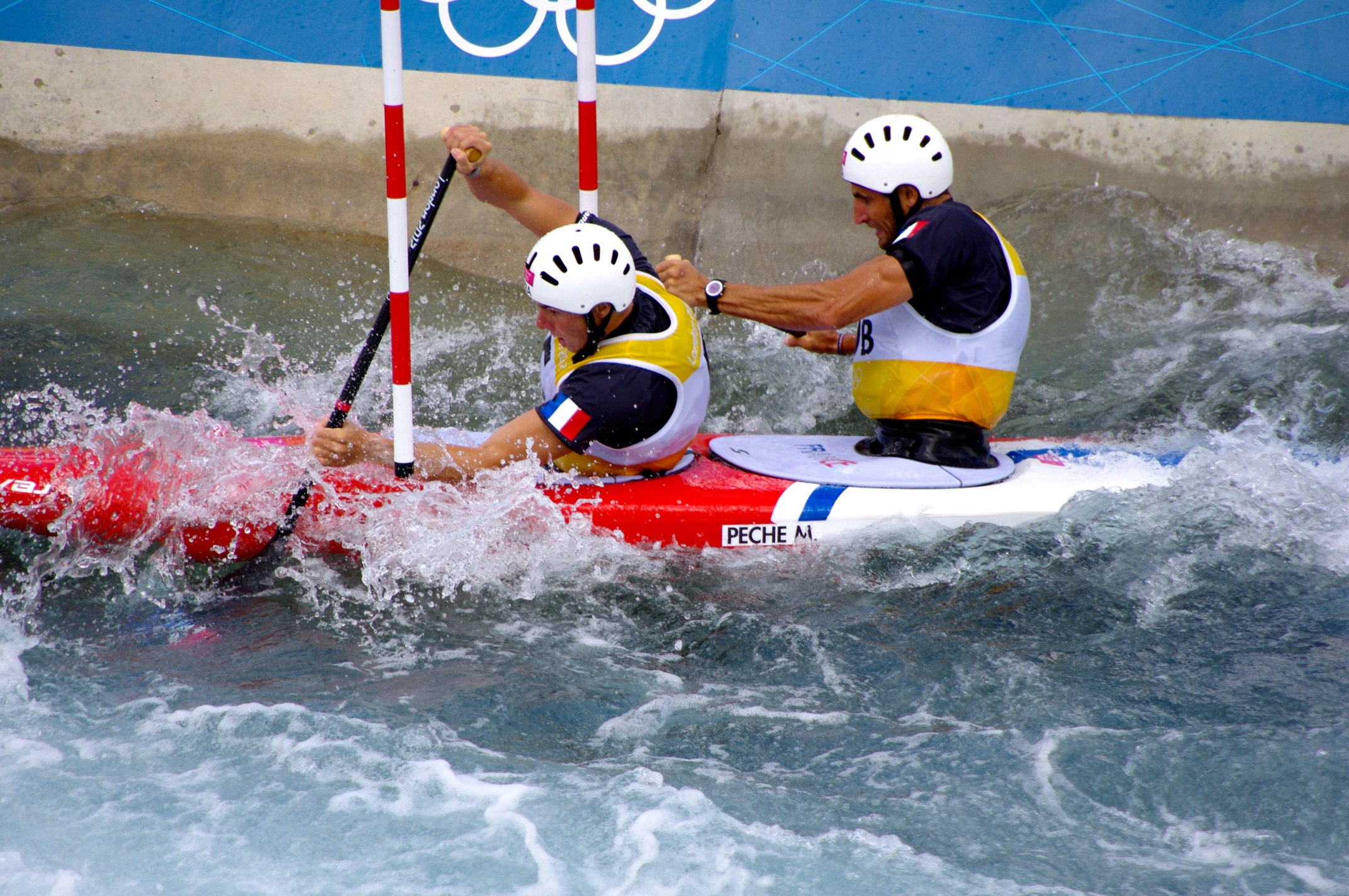
Gauthier Klauss and Matthieu Péché in C-2 semifinal

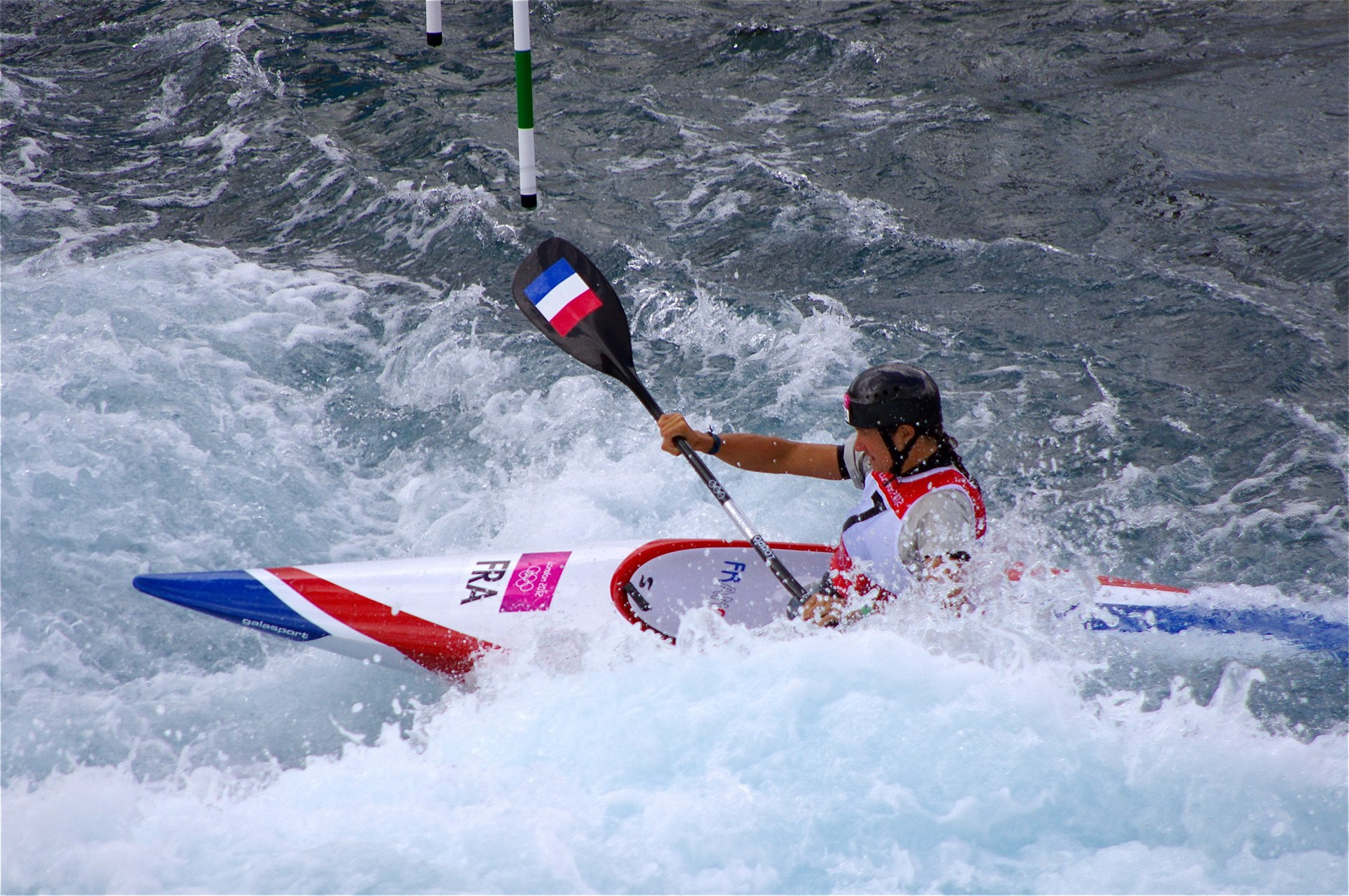
Émilie Fer in K-1 semifinal

=== Sprint ===
France qualified boats for the following sprint events:

Men

Athlete	Event	Heats		Semifinals		Final	
Athlete	Event	Time	Rank	Time	Rank	Time	Rank
Maxime Beaumont	K-1 200 m	35.571	2 Q	35.814	2 FA	36.688	4
Cyrille Carré	K-1 1000 m	3:32.705	5 Q	3:38.981	8 FB	3:33.513	12
Mathieu Goubel	C-1 200 m	41.248 OB	1 Q	41.938	2 FA	44.045	7
Mathieu Goubel	C-1 1000 m	3:58.122	1 Q	3:51.811	1 FA	3:50.758	5
Arnaud Hybois; Sébastien Jouve	K-2 200 m	32.933	3 Q	32.668	3 FA	35.012	4

Women

Athlete	Event	Heats		Semifinals		Final	
Athlete	Event	Time	Rank	Time	Rank	Time	Rank
Marie Delattre; Sarah Guyot; Joanne Mayer; Gabrielle Tuleu	K-4 500 m	1:40.022	3 Q	1:33.303	5 FA	1:35.299	8

Qualification Legend: FA = Qualify to final (medal); FB = Qualify to final B (non-medal)

== Cycling ==
=== Road ===
Men

Athlete	Event	Time	Rank
Mickaël Bourgain	Road race	Did not finish	
Sylvain Chavanel	Road race	5:46:05	20
Sylvain Chavanel	Time trial	56:07.67	29
Arnaud Démare	Road race	5:46;37	30
Tony Gallopin	Road race	5:46:37	86

Women

Athlete	Event	Time	Rank
Aude Biannic	Road race	3:35:56	10
Audrey Cordon	Road race	OTL	
Audrey Cordon	Time trial	40:40.51	15
Pauline Ferrand-Prévot	Road race	3:35:56	8

=== Track ===
Sprint

Athlete	Event	Qualification		Round 1	Repechage 1	Round 2	Repechage 2	Quarterfinals	Semifinals	Final	
Athlete	Event	Time Speed (km/h)	Rank	Opposition Time Speed (km/h)	Opposition Time Speed (km/h)	Opposition Time Speed (km/h)	Opposition Time Speed (km/h)	Opposition Time Speed (km/h)	Opposition Time Speed (km/h)	Opposition Time Speed (km/h)	Rank
Grégory Baugé	Men's sprint	9.952; 72.347	2	Volkakis (GRE); W DSQ	Bye	Nakagawa (JPN); W 10.490; 68.636	Bye	Förstemann (GER); W 10.490, W 10.300	Perkins (AUS); W 10.358, W 10.268	Kenny (GBR); L, L	2nd place, silver medalist(s)
Virginie Cueff	Women's sprint	11.439; 62.942	15	Vogel (GER); L	Kanis (NED); Larreal (VEN); L	Did not advance					

Team sprint

Athlete	Event	Qualification		Semifinals		Final	
Athlete	Event	Time Speed (km/h)	Rank	Opposition Time Speed (km/h)	Rank	Opposition Time Speed (km/h)	Rank
Grégory Baugé; Michaël D'Almeida; Kévin Sireau	Men's team sprint	43.097; 62.649	2 Q	New Zealand; W 42.991; 62.803	2 Q	Great Britain; L 43.013; 62.771	2nd place, silver medalist(s)
Sandie Clair; Virginie Cueff	Women's team sprint	33.638; 53.510	6 Q	Germany; L 33.707; 53.401	6	Did not advance	

Keirin

Athlete	Event	1st round	Repechage	2nd round	Final
Athlete	Event	Rank	Rank	Rank	Rank
Mickaël Bourgain	Men's keirin	1 Q	Bye	4	8
Clara Sanchez	Women's keirin	6	1 Q	2 Q	4

Omnium

Athlete	Event	Flying lap		Points race		Elimination race	Individual pursuit		Scratch race	Time trial		Total points	Rank
Athlete	Event	Time	Rank	Points	Rank	Rank	Time	Rank	Rank	Time	Rank	Total points	Rank
Bryan Coquard	Men's omnium	13.347	5	51	4	1	4:30.780	12	3	1:03.078	4	29	2nd place, silver medalist(s)
Clara Sanchez	Women's omnium	14.058	2	0	18	13	3:56.800	18	18	35.451	3	72	14

=== Mountain biking ===
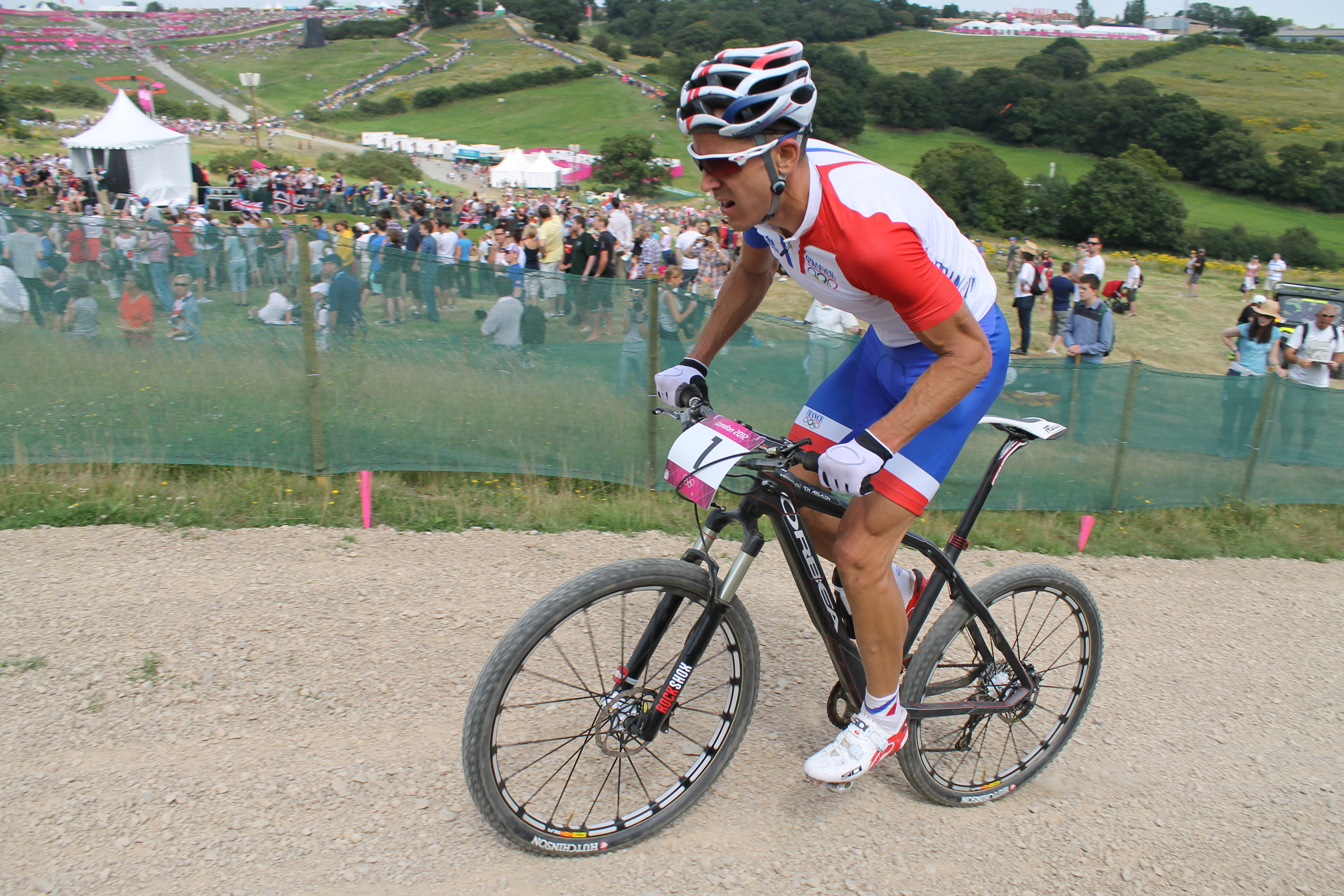
Julien Absalon abandoned men's cross-country race due to punctured tyre

Athlete	Event	Time	Rank
Julien Absalon	Men's cross-country	Did not finish	
Jean-Christophe Péraud	Men's cross-country	1:37:07	29
Stéphane Tempier	Men's cross-country	1:31:30	11
Julie Bresset	Women's cross-country	1:30:52	1st place, gold medalist(s)
Pauline Ferrand-Prévot	Women's cross-country	1:42:21	26

=== BMX ===
Athlete	Event	Seeding		Quarterfinal		Semifinal		Final	
Athlete	Event	Result	Rank	Points	Rank	Points	Rank	Result	Rank
Quentin Caleyron	Men's BMX	38.637	9	19	3 q	18	6	Did not advance	
Joris Daudet	Men's BMX	38.221	2	7	2 Q	16	6	Did not advance	
Moana Moo-Caille	Men's BMX	40.015	28	23	6	Did not advance			
Laëtitia Le Corguillé	Women's BMX	38.976	4	—N/a		15	4 Q	38.476	4
Magalie Pottier	Women's BMX	39.778	7	—N/a		6	2 Q	39.393	7

== Diving ==
France qualified five quota places for the diving events:

Men

Athlete	Event	Preliminaries		Semifinals		Final	
Athlete	Event	Points	Rank	Points	Rank	Points	Rank
Damien Cely	3 m springboard	413.30	22	Did not advance			
Matthieu Rosset	3 m springboard	445.15	13 Q	422.50	15	Did not advance	

Women

Athlete	Event	Preliminaries		Semifinals		Final	
Athlete	Event	Points	Rank	Points	Rank	Points	Rank
Fanny Bouvet	3 m springboard	257.10	26	Did not advance			
Marion Farissier	3 m springboard	248.70	27	Did not advance			
Audrey Labeau	10 m platform	261.05	24	Did not advance			

== Equestrian ==
=== Dressage ===
France qualified a single quota by rankings:

Athlete	Horse	Event	Grand Prix		Grand Prix Special		Grand Prix Freestyle		Overall	
Athlete	Horse	Event	Score	Rank	Score	Rank	Technical	Artistic	Score	Rank
Jessica Michel	Riwera de Hus	Individual	70.410	28 Q	68.810	31	Did not advance			

=== Eventing ===
France qualified one team and five quota places in the individual event after finishing in second place at the 2011 European Eventing Championships.

Athlete	Horse	Event	Dressage		Cross-country			Jumping						Total	
Athlete	Horse	Event	Dressage		Cross-country			Qualifier			Final			Total	
Athlete	Horse	Event	Penalties	Rank	Penalties	Total	Rank	Penalties	Total	Rank	Penalties	Total	Rank	Penalties	Rank
Lionel Guyon	Nemetis de Lalou	Individual	50.90	38	20.00	70.90	38	0.00	70.90	28 Q	21.00	91.90	24	91.90	24
Aurélien Kahn	Cádiz	Individual	55.90	54	39.60	95.50	49	7.00	102.50	45	Did not advance			102.50	45
Denis Mesples	Oregon de la Vigne	Individual	61.50	66	46.00	107.50	=51	19.00	126.50	50	Did not advance			126.50	50
Donatien Schauly	Ocarina du Chanois	Individual	44.40	20	7.20	51.60	=18	Withdrew							
Nicolas Touzaint	Hildago de l'ille	Individual	47.60	=27	7.60	55.20	27	2.00	57.20	21 Q	7.00	64.20	17	64.20	17
Lionel Guyon; Aurélien Kahn; Denis Mesples; Donatien Schauly; Nicolas Touzaint	See above	Team	142.90	9	34.80	177.70	7	52.90	230.60	8	—N/a			230.60	8

=== Show jumping ===
France qualified one team and four quota places in the individual event after finishing in second place at the World Equestrian Games.

Athlete	Horse	Event	Qualification								Final					Total	
Athlete	Horse	Event	Round 1		Round 2			Round 3			Round A		Round B			Total	
Athlete	Horse	Event	Penalties	Rank	Penalties	Total	Rank	Penalties	Total	Rank	Penalties	Rank	Penalties	Total	Rank	Penalties	Rank
Simon Delestre	Napoli du Ry	Individual	0	=1 Q	6	6	30 Q	8	14	32 Q	4	=11 Q	8	12	19	12	19
Olivier Guillon	Lord de Theize	Individual	4	=42 Q	4	8	=31 Q	8	16	=33 Q	0	=1 Q	9	9	=12	9	=12
Pénélope Leprevost	Mylord Carthago	Individual	1	=33 Q	8	9	=47	Did not advance								9	=47
Kevin Staut	Silvana	Individual	0	=1 Q	4	4	=17 Q	4	8	=11 Q	16	34	Did not advance			16	34
Simon Delestre; Olivier Guillon; Pénélope Leprevost; Kevin Staut	See above	Team	—N/a								14	12	Did not advance			14	12

== Fencing ==
France qualified 11 fencers.

Men

Athlete	Event	Round of 64	Round of 32	Round of 16	Quarterfinal	Semifinal	Final / BM	
Athlete	Event	Opposition Score	Opposition Score	Opposition Score	Opposition Score	Opposition Score	Opposition Score	Rank
Yannick Borel	Individual épée	—N/a	Karyuchenko (UKR); W 15–10	Kauter (SUI); W 15–11	Piasecki (NOR); L 14–15	Did not advance		
Gauthier Grumier	Individual épée	—N/a	Piasecki (NOR); L 13–14	Did not advance				
Erwann Le Péchoux	Individual foil	Bye	Lefort (FRA); W 15–9	Choi B-c (KOR); L 13–15	Did not advance			
Enzo Lefort	Individual foil	Bye	Le Péchoux (FRA); L 9–15	Did not advance				
Victor Sintès	Individual foil	Bye	Chida (JPN); W 15–11	Lei S (CHN); L 6–15	Did not advance			
Erwann Le Péchoux; Enzo Lefort; Marcel Marcilloux; Victor Sintès	Team foil	—N/a			United States; L 39–45	Classification semi-final Great Britain; L 29–45	7th place final China; L 33–45	8
Boladé Apithy	Individual sabre	Bye	Buikevich (BLR); L 11–15	Did not advance				

Women

Athlete	Event	Round of 64	Round of 32	Round of 16	Quarterfinal	Semifinal	Final / BM	
Athlete	Event	Opposition Score	Opposition Score	Opposition Score	Opposition Score	Opposition Score	Opposition Score	Rank
Laura Flessel-Colovic	Individual épée	Bye	Hurley (USA); W 15–12	Gherman (ROM); L 13–15	Did not advance			
Astrid Guyart	Individual foil	Bye	Gaber (EGY); W 15–2	Boubakri (TUN); L 5–15	Did not advance			
Corinne Maîtrejean	Individual foil	Bye	Sheppard (GBR); W 15–5	Sugawara (JPN); L 9–15	Did not advance			
Ysaora Thibus	Individual foil	Bye	Deriglazova (RUS); W 15–8	Ikehata (JPN); L 11–15	Did not advance			
Anita Blaze; Astrid Guyart; Corinne Maîtrejean; Ysaora Thibus	Team foil	—N/a			Poland; W 42–31	Italy; L 31–45	South Korea; L 32–45	4
Léonore Perrus	Individual sabre	—N/a	Nakayama (JPN); L 12–15	Did not advance				

== Football ==
- Women's team event – 1 team of 18 players

=== Women's tournament ===
Roster

Head coach: Bruno Bini

France named a squad of 18 players and 4 alternates for the tournament.

No.	Pos.	Player	Date of birth (age)	Caps	Goals	Club
1	GK	Céline Deville	24 January 1982 (aged 30)	54	0	(French Football Federation) Lyon
2	DF	Wendie Renard	20 July 1990 (aged 22)	22	3	(French Football Federation) Lyon
3	MF	Laure Boulleau	22 October 1986 (aged 25)	27	1	(French Football Federation) Paris Saint-Germain
4	DF	Laura Georges	20 August 1984 (aged 27)	118	3	(French Football Federation) Lyon
5	DF	Ophélie Meilleroux	18 January 1984 (aged 28)	61	0	(French Football Federation) Montpellier
6	MF	Sandrine Soubeyrand (captain)	16 August 1973 (aged 38)	177	18	(French Football Federation) Juvisy
7	DF	Corine Franco	5 October 1983 (aged 28)	63	10	(French Football Federation) Lyon
8	DF	Sonia Bompastor	8 June 1980 (aged 32)	149	18	(French Football Federation) Lyon
9	FW	Eugénie Le Sommer	18 May 1989 (aged 23)	56	19	(French Football Federation) Lyon
10	MF	Camille Abily	5 December 1984 (aged 27)	97	23	(French Football Federation) Lyon
11	FW	Marie-Laure Delie	29 January 1988 (aged 24)	40	35	(French Football Federation) Montpellier
12	FW	Élodie Thomis	13 August 1986 (aged 25)	72	23	(French Football Federation) Lyon
13	MF	Camille Catala	6 May 1991 (aged 21)	7	1	(French Football Federation) Saint-Étienne
14	MF	Louisa Nécib	23 January 1987 (aged 25)	79	16	(French Football Federation) Lyon
15	MF	Élise Bussaglia	24 September 1984 (aged 27)	101	20	(French Football Federation) Paris Saint-Germain
16	DF	Sabrina Viguier	4 January 1981 (aged 31)	91	1	(French Football Federation) Lyon
17	FW	Gaëtane Thiney	28 October 1985 (aged 26)	70	32	(French Football Federation) Juvisy
18	GK	Sarah Bouhaddi	17 October 1986 (aged 25)	52	0	(French Football Federation) Lyon

Group play

Pos	Team	Pld	W	D	L	GF	GA	GD	Pts	Qualification
1	United States	3	3	0	0	8	2	+6	9	Qualified for the quarter-finals
2	France	3	2	0	1	8	4	+4	6	Qualified for the quarter-finals
3	North Korea	3	1	0	2	2	6	−4	3	
4	Colombia	3	0	0	3	0	6	−6	0	

Source: IOC
25 July 2012
17:00

United States	4–2	France
Wambach 19'; Morgan 32', 66'; Lloyd 56'	Report	Thiney 12'; Delie 14'

Hampden Park, Glasgow
Attendance: 18,090
Referee: Sachiko Yamagishi (Japan)

28 July 2012
19:45

France	5–0	North Korea
Georges 45'; Thomis 70'; Delie 71'; Renard 81'; Catala 87'	Report

Hampden Park, Glasgow
Attendance: 11,743
Referee: Thérèse Neguel (Cameroon)

31 July 2012
17:15

France	1–0	Colombia
Thomis 5'	Report

St James' Park, Newcastle
Attendance: 13,184
Referee: Quetzalli Alvarado (Mexico)

Quarter-final

3 August 2012
12:00

Sweden	1–2	France
Fischer 18'	Report; Report	Georges 29'; Renard 39'

Hampden Park, Glasgow
Attendance: 12,869
Referee: Kari Seitz (United States)

Semi-final

6 August 2012
17:00

France	1–2	Japan
Le Sommer 76'	Report	Ōgimi 32'; Sakaguchi 49'

Wembley Stadium, London
Attendance: 61,482
Referee: Quetzalli Alvarado (Mexico)

Bronze medal game

9 August 2012
13:00

(bronze) Canada	1–0	France
Matheson 90+2'	Report

City of Coventry Stadium, Coventry
Attendance: 12,465
Referee: Jenny Palmqvist (Sweden)

== Gymnastics ==
=== Artistic ===
Men
Team

Athlete	Event	Qualification								Final							
Athlete	Event	Apparatus						Total	Rank	Apparatus						Total	Rank
Athlete	Event	F	PH	R	V	PB	HB	Total	Rank	F	PH	R	V	PB	HB	Total	Rank
Pierre-Yves Bény	Team	14.433	13.566	14.266	14.933	14.700	—N/a			14.333	15.033	14.466	14.566	14.591	13.266	—N/a	
Yann Cucherat	Team	—N/a				14.900	14.366	—N/a		Did not compete						—N/a	
Gaël Da Silva	Team	15.400	—N/a	14.366	15.366	—N/a	14.966	—N/a		15.200	—N/a	14.633	15.466	—N/a	14.766	—N/a	
Hamilton Sabot	Team	—N/a	14.033	14.533	—N/a	15.366 Q	14.866	—N/a		—N/a	14.766	14.333	—N/a	15.566	14.883	—N/a	
Cyril Tommasone	Team	14.500	15.333 Q	14.166	15.466	15.100	14.133	88.698	14 Q	14.533	15.466	—N/a	14.441	15.133	—N/a		
Total	Team	44.333	42.932	43.165	45.765	45.366	44.198	265.759	8 Q	44.066	45.265	43.432	44.473	45.290	42.915	265.441	8

Individual finals

Athlete	Event	Apparatus						Total	Rank
Athlete	Event	F	PH	R	V	PB	HB	Total	Rank
Hamilton Sabot	Parallel bars	—N/a				15.566	—N/a	15.566	3rd place, bronze medalist(s)
Cyril Tommasone	All-around	13.500	15.333	14.400	15.358	15.000	14.066	87.657	16
Cyril Tommasone	Pommel horse	—N/a	15.141	—N/a				15.141	5

Women
Team

Athlete	Event	Qualification						Final					
Athlete	Event	Apparatus				Total	Rank	Apparatus				Total	Rank
Athlete	Event	F	V	UB	BB	Total	Rank	F	V	UB	BB	Total	Rank
Mira Boumejmajen	Team	12.933	—N/a	13.300	12.966	—N/a		Did not advance					
Youna Dufournet	Team	—N/a	14.166	12.966	14.200	—N/a		Did not advance					
Anne Kuhm	Team	13.533	14.466	13.533	12.566	54.098	29	Did not advance					
Aurélie Malaussena	Team	13.366	14.033	13.300	13.700	54.399	25 Q	Did not advance					
Sophia Serseri	Team	12.933	14.133	—N/a				Did not advance					
Total	Team	39.832	42.765	41.333	40.866	164.796	11	Did not advance					

Individual finals

Athlete	Event	Apparatus				Total	Rank
Athlete	Event	F	V	UB	BB	Total	Rank
Aurélie Malaussena	All-around	13.800	12.800	12.066	11.500	50.166	23

=== Rhythmic ===
Athlete	Event	Qualification						Final					
Athlete	Event	Hoop	Ball	Clubs	Ribbon	Total	Rank	Hoop	Ball	Clubs	Ribbon	Total	Rank
Delphine Ledoux	Individual	27.150	27.100	27.250	26.675	108.175	13	Did not advance					

=== Trampoline ===
Athlete	Event	Qualification		Final	
Athlete	Event	Score	Rank	Score	Rank
Grégroire Pennes	Men's	107.539	7 Q	58.805	7

== Handball ==
France participated in the 2012 Olympics as the defending world men's handball champion, and successfully defended its gold medal from the 2008 Summer Olympics. The French women's team qualified through the World Qualification Tournament.

- Men's team event – 1 team of 14 players
- Women's team event – 1 team of 14 players

=== Men's tournament ===
The following is the France roster in the men's handball tournament of the 2012 Summer Olympics.

Head coaches: Claude Onesta

No.	Pos.	Name	Date of birth (age)	Height	App.	Goals	Club
2	LB	Jérôme Fernandez	7 March 1977 (aged 35)	1.99 m			(France) Fénix Toulouse
3	P	Didier Dinart	18 January 1977 (aged 35)	1.97 m			(Spain) Atlético Madrid
4	RB	Xavier Barachet	19 November 1988 (aged 23)	1.95 m			(France) Chambéry Handball
5	CB	Guillaume Gille	12 July 1976 (aged 36)	1.92 m			(Germany) HSV Hamburg
6	P	Bertrand Gille	24 March 1978 (aged 34)	1.87 m			(Germany) HSV Hamburg
8	LB	Daniel Narcisse	16 December 1979 (aged 32)	1.89 m			(Germany) THW Kiel
9	RW	Guillaume Joli	27 March 1985 (aged 27)	1.78 m			(Spain) BM Valladolid
11	LW	Samuel Honrubia	5 July 1986 (aged 26)	1.80 m			(France) Montpellier
12	GK	Daouda Karaboué	11 December 1975 (aged 36)	1.98 m			(France) Fénix Toulouse
13	CB	Nikola Karabatić	11 April 1984 (aged 28)	1.96 m			(France) Montpellier
16	GK	Thierry Omeyer	2 November 1976 (aged 35)	1.92 m			(Germany) THW Kiel
18	LB	William Accambray	8 April 1988 (aged 24)	1.94 m			(France) Montpellier
19	RW	Luc Abalo	6 September 1984 (aged 27)	1.82 m			(Spain) Atlético Madrid
20	P	Cédric Sorhaindo	7 June 1984 (aged 28)	1.92 m			(Spain) FC Barcelona
21	LW	Michaël Guigou	28 January 1982 (aged 30)	1.79 m			(France) Montpellier

Group play

Team	Pld	W	D	L	GF	GA	GD	Pts	Qualification
Iceland	5	5	0	0	167	132	+35	10	Quarter-finals
France	5	4	0	1	159	110	+49	8	Quarter-finals
Sweden	5	3	0	2	156	115	+41	6	Quarter-finals
Tunisia	5	2	0	3	121	125	−4	4	Quarter-finals
Argentina	5	1	0	4	113	138	−25	2	
Great Britain	5	0	0	5	96	192	−96	0	

29 July 2012; 19:30	France	44 – 15	Great Britain	Copper Box, London; Attendance: 5,000; Referees: Abdulla, Bamutref (QAT)
29 July 2012; 19:30	Joli 11	(21–7)	Garnham 6	Copper Box, London; Attendance: 5,000; Referees: Abdulla, Bamutref (QAT)
29 July 2012; 19:30	2× (yellow card) 2× (suspension)	Report	3× (yellow card) 4× (suspension) 1× (red card)	Copper Box, London; Attendance: 5,000; Referees: Abdulla, Bamutref (QAT)

31 July 2012; 21:15	Argentina	20 – 32	France	Copper Box, London; Attendance: 3,906; Referees: Olesen, Peders (DEN)
31 July 2012; 21:15	Fernández, Riccobelli 4	(9–17)	Karabatić 7	Copper Box, London; Attendance: 3,906; Referees: Olesen, Peders (DEN)
31 July 2012; 21:15	3× (yellow card) 2× (suspension)	Report	3× (yellow card) 2× (suspension)	Copper Box, London; Attendance: 3,906; Referees: Olesen, Peders (DEN)

2 August 2012; 11:15	France	25 – 19	Tunisia	Copper Box, London; Attendance: 4,670; Referees: Nikolić, Stojković (SRB)
2 August 2012; 11:15	Narcisse 7	(12–11)	Bannour 5	Copper Box, London; Attendance: 4,670; Referees: Nikolić, Stojković (SRB)
2 August 2012; 11:15	4× (yellow card) 5× (suspension)	Report	4× (yellow card) 7× (suspension)	Copper Box, London; Attendance: 4,670; Referees: Nikolić, Stojković (SRB)

4 August 2012; 19:30	Iceland	30 – 29	France	Copper Box, London; Attendance: 4,521; Referees: Krstić, Ljubić (SLO)
4 August 2012; 19:30	Petersson 6	(16–15)	Fernandez 9	Copper Box, London; Attendance: 4,521; Referees: Krstić, Ljubić (SLO)
4 August 2012; 19:30	3× (yellow card) 7× (suspension)	Report	2× (yellow card) 4× (suspension)	Copper Box, London; Attendance: 4,521; Referees: Krstić, Ljubić (SLO)

6 August 2012; 21:15	France	29 – 26	Sweden	Copper Box, London; Attendance: 4,833; Referees: Gubica, Milošević (CRO)
6 August 2012; 21:15	Narcisse 6	(18–12)	Ekberg, Andersson 5	Copper Box, London; Attendance: 4,833; Referees: Gubica, Milošević (CRO)
6 August 2012; 21:15	3× (yellow card) 1× (suspension)	Report	3× (yellow card) 2× (suspension)	Copper Box, London; Attendance: 4,833; Referees: Gubica, Milošević (CRO)

Quarter-final

8 August 2012; 14:30	Spain	22 – 23	France	Basketball Arena, London; Attendance: 8,890; Referees: Nikolić, Stojković (SRB)
8 August 2012; 14:30	Tomás 6	(12–9)	Accambray 7	Basketball Arena, London; Attendance: 8,890; Referees: Nikolić, Stojković (SRB)
8 August 2012; 14:30	4× (yellow card) 3× (suspension)	Report	4× (yellow card) 3× (suspension)	Basketball Arena, London; Attendance: 8,890; Referees: Nikolić, Stojković (SRB)

Semi-final

10 August 2012; 20:30	France	25 – 22	Croatia	Basketball Arena, London; Attendance: 9,849; Referees: Abrahamsen, Kristiansen (NOR)
10 August 2012; 20:30	three players 4	(12–10)	Horvat 6	Basketball Arena, London; Attendance: 9,849; Referees: Abrahamsen, Kristiansen (NOR)
10 August 2012; 20:30	4× (yellow card) 2× (suspension)	Report	4× (yellow card) 2× (suspension)	Basketball Arena, London; Attendance: 9,849; Referees: Abrahamsen, Kristiansen (NOR)

Final

12 August 2012; 15:00	Sweden	21 – 22	France	Basketball Arena, London; Attendance: 9,627; Referees: Krstić, Ljubić (SLO)
12 August 2012; 15:00	Ekberg 6	(8–10)	Guigou 5	Basketball Arena, London; Attendance: 9,627; Referees: Krstić, Ljubić (SLO)
12 August 2012; 15:00	3× (yellow card) 4× (suspension)	Report	4× (yellow card) 2× (suspension)	Basketball Arena, London; Attendance: 9,627; Referees: Krstić, Ljubić (SLO)

=== Women's tournament ===
The following is the France roster in the women's handball tournament of the 2012 Summer Olympics.

Head coaches: Olivier Krumbholz

No.	Pos.	Name	Date of birth (age)	Height	App.	Goals	Club
3	RW	Blandine Dancette	14 February 1988 (aged 24)	1.69 m			(France) HBC Nîmes
4	P	Nina Kamto Njitam	25 June 1983 (aged 29)	1.78 m			(France) Metz Handball
5	RB	Camille Ayglon	21 May 1985 (aged 27)	1.80 m			(France) HBC Nîmes
7	CB	Allison Pineau	2 May 1989 (aged 23)	1.81 m			(Romania) Oltchim Vâlcea
8	LB	Claudine Mendy	8 January 1990 (aged 22)	1.82 m			(France) Metz Handball
9	LW	Paule Baudouin	25 October 1984 (aged 27)	1.72 m			(France) Metz Handball
10	CB	Sophie Herbrecht	13 February 1982 (aged 30)	1.74 m			(France) HBC Nîmes
12	GK	Amandine Leynaud	2 May 1986 (aged 26)	1.78 m			(Romania) Oltchim Vâlcea
16	GK	Cléopâtre Darleux	1 July 1989 (aged 23)	1.76 m			(France) Arvor 29
17	LW	Siraba Dembélé	28 June 1986 (aged 26)	1.72 m			(France) Toulon HB
18	RW	Audrey Deroin	6 September 1989 (aged 22)	1.76 m			(France) Toulon HB
20	LB	Raphaëlle Tervel	21 April 1979 (aged 33)	1.78 m			(Spain) SD Itxako
24	LB	Mariama Signaté	22 July 1985 (aged 27)	1.89 m			(France) Issy Paris HB
64	RB	Alexandra Lacrabère	27 April 1987 (aged 25)	1.77 m			(France) Arvor 29

Group play

Team	Pld	W	D	L	GF	GA	GD	Pts	Qualification
France	5	4	1	0	125	103	+22	9	Quarter-finals
South Korea	5	3	1	1	136	130	+6	7	Quarter-finals
Spain	5	3	1	1	119	114	+5	7	Quarter-finals
Norway	5	2	1	2	118	120	−2	5	Quarter-finals
Denmark	5	1	0	4	113	121	−8	2	
Sweden	5	0	0	5	108	131	−23	0	

28 July 2012; 21:15	Norway	23 – 24	France	Copper Box, London; Attendance: 3,968; Referees: Krstić, Ljubić (SLO)
28 July 2012; 21:15	Alstad 5	(12–17)	Baudouin, Signaté 5	Copper Box, London; Attendance: 3,968; Referees: Krstić, Ljubić (SLO)
28 July 2012; 21:15	3× (yellow card) 2× (suspension)	Report	4× (yellow card) 5× (suspension) 1× (red card)	Copper Box, London; Attendance: 3,968; Referees: Krstić, Ljubić (SLO)

30 July 2012; 16:15	France	18 – 18	Spain	Copper Box, London; Attendance: 4,671; Referees: Horáček, Novotný (CZE)
30 July 2012; 16:15	Dembélé 6	(7–10)	Mangué 6	Copper Box, London; Attendance: 4,671; Referees: Horáček, Novotný (CZE)
30 July 2012; 16:15	3× (yellow card) 6× (suspension) 1× (red card)	Report	4× (yellow card) 4× (suspension)	Copper Box, London; Attendance: 4,671; Referees: Horáček, Novotný (CZE)

1 August 2012; 14:30	France	29 – 17	Sweden	Copper Box, London; Attendance: 4,638; Referees: Gubica, Milošević (CRO)
1 August 2012; 14:30	three players 4	(16–11)	Ahlm 6	Copper Box, London; Attendance: 4,638; Referees: Gubica, Milošević (CRO)
1 August 2012; 14:30	3× (yellow card) 2× (suspension)	Report	3× (yellow card) 1× (suspension)	Copper Box, London; Attendance: 4,638; Referees: Gubica, Milošević (CRO)

3 August 2012; 11:15	South Korea	21 – 24	France	Copper Box, London; Attendance: 4,568; Referees: Nikolić, Stojković (SRB)
3 August 2012; 11:15	Sim Hae-in 6	(12–10)	Lacrabère 4	Copper Box, London; Attendance: 4,568; Referees: Nikolić, Stojković (SRB)
3 August 2012; 11:15	2× (yellow card) 3× (suspension)	Report	4× (yellow card) 2× (suspension)	Copper Box, London; Attendance: 4,568; Referees: Nikolić, Stojković (SRB)

5 August 2012; 21:15	Denmark	24 – 30	France	Copper Box, London; Attendance: 4,616; Referees: Duţă, Florescu (ROU)
5 August 2012; 21:15	Nørgaard 10	(10–17)	Nijtam 6	Copper Box, London; Attendance: 4,616; Referees: Duţă, Florescu (ROU)
5 August 2012; 21:15	3× (yellow card) 2× (suspension)	Report	2× (yellow card) 1× (suspension)	Copper Box, London; Attendance: 4,616; Referees: Duţă, Florescu (ROU)

Quarter-final

7 August 2012; 20:30	France	22 – 23	Montenegro	Copper Box, London; Attendance: 4,559; Referees: Olesen, Pedersen (DEN)
7 August 2012; 20:30	Signaté 5	(13–13)	Popović, Bulatović 6	Copper Box, London; Attendance: 4,559; Referees: Olesen, Pedersen (DEN)
7 August 2012; 20:30	3× (yellow card) 2× (suspension)	Report	4× (yellow card) 3× (suspension)	Copper Box, London; Attendance: 4,559; Referees: Olesen, Pedersen (DEN)

== Judo ==
Men

Athlete	Event	Round of 64	Round of 32	Round of 16	Quarterfinals	Semifinals	Repechage	Final / BM	
Athlete	Event	Opposition Result	Opposition Result	Opposition Result	Opposition Result	Opposition Result	Opposition Result	Opposition Result	Rank
Sofiane Milous	−60 kg	Bye	Shukvani (GEO); W 0100–0001	Lomo (SOL); W 0020–0001	Hiraoka (JPN); L 0010–0012	Did not advance	Davtyan (ARM); W 0010–0002	Sobirov (UZB); L 0003–0100	5
David Larose	−66 kg	Pollack (ISR); W 0001–0000	Fâșie (ROU); W 0100–0000	Shavdatuashvili (GEO); L 0001–0100	Did not advance				
Ugo Legrand	−73 kg	Bye	Adamiec (POL); W 0010–0000	Hafiz (EGY); W 0100–0104	Elmont (NED); L 0030–0000	Did not advance	Boqiev (TJK); W 0010–0002	Wang K-c (KOR); W 0101–0001	3rd place, bronze medalist(s)
Alain Schmitt	−81 kg	—N/a	Elmont (NED); W 0000–0001	Lucenti (ARG); L 0000–1000	Did not advance				
Romain Buffet	−90 kg	—N/a	Bauža (LTU); L 0010–0100	Did not advance					
Thierry Fabre	−100 kg	—N/a	Darwish (EGY); W 0011–0002	Naidangiin (MGL); L 0000–0100	Did not advance				
Teddy Riner	+100 kg	—N/a	Wojnarowicz (POL); W 0010–0003	Jaballah (TUN); W 0101–0002	Brayson (CUB); W 0100–0001	Kim S-M (KOR); W 0010–0003	Bye	Mikhailine (RUS); W 0101–0003	1st place, gold medalist(s)

Women

Athlete	Event	Round of 32	Round of 16	Quarterfinals	Semifinals	Repechage	Final / BM	
Athlete	Event	Opposition Result	Opposition Result	Opposition Result	Opposition Result	Opposition Result	Opposition Result	Rank
Laëtitia Payet	−48 kg	Bye	Menezes (BRA); L 0001–0000	Did not advance				
Priscilla Gneto	−52 kg	He Hm (CHN); W 0111–0012	Ramos (POR); W 1001–0000	An K-a (PRK); L 0013–0102	Did not advance	Kim K-o (KOR); W 0021–0002	Heylen (BEL); W 1012–0012	3rd place, bronze medalist(s)
Automne Pavia	−57 kg	Clark (GBR); W 0100–0000	Renzi (AUS); W 0150–0000	Filzmoser (AUT); W 0030–0000	Matsumoto (JPN); L 0000–0010	Bye	Karakas (HUN); W 0011–0002	3rd place, bronze medalist(s)
Gévrise Émane	−63 kg	Howell (GBR); W 1000–0000	Abel (CUB); W 0001–0001	Tsedevsuren (MGL); L 0001–0001	Did not advance	Schlesinger (ISR); W 0010–0002	Joung D-w (KOR); W 0000–0000 YUS	3rd place, bronze medalist(s)
Lucie Décosse	−70 kg	Bye	Zupancic (CAN); W 1001–0001	Alvear (COL); W 1000–0000	Hwang Y-s (KOR); W 0001–0000	Bye	Thiele (GER); W 0120–0000	1st place, gold medalist(s)
Audrey Tcheuméo	−78 kg	Cotton (CAN); W 0001–0001 YUS	Pryshchepa (UKR); W 0100–0000	Yang X (CHN); W 0101–0001	Gibbons (GBR); L 0000–1000	Did not advance	Joó (HUN); W 1000–0001	3rd place, bronze medalist(s)
Anne-Sophie Mondière	+78 kg	Altheman (BRA); L 0000–0101	Did not advance					

== Modern pentathlon ==
France qualified one man and two women.

Athlete	Event	Fencing (épée one touch)			Swimming (200 m freestyle)			Riding (show jumping)			Combined: shooting/running (10 m air pistol)/(3000 m)			Total points	Final rank
Athlete	Event	Results	Rank	MP points	Time	Rank	MP points	Penalties	Rank	MP points	Time	Rank	MP Points	Total points	Final rank
Christopher Patte	Men's	16–19	=20	784	2:05.99	20	1292	84	21	1116	10:43.96	11	2428	5620	17
Amélie Cazé	Women's	19–16	=11	856	2:11.33	4	1224	20	2	1180	12:08.71	32	1848	5108	18
Élodie Clouvel	Women's	15–20	=25	760	2:09.87	3	1244	140	27	1060	12:44.50	34	1704	4768	31

== Rowing ==
France qualified boats for the following rowing events:

Men

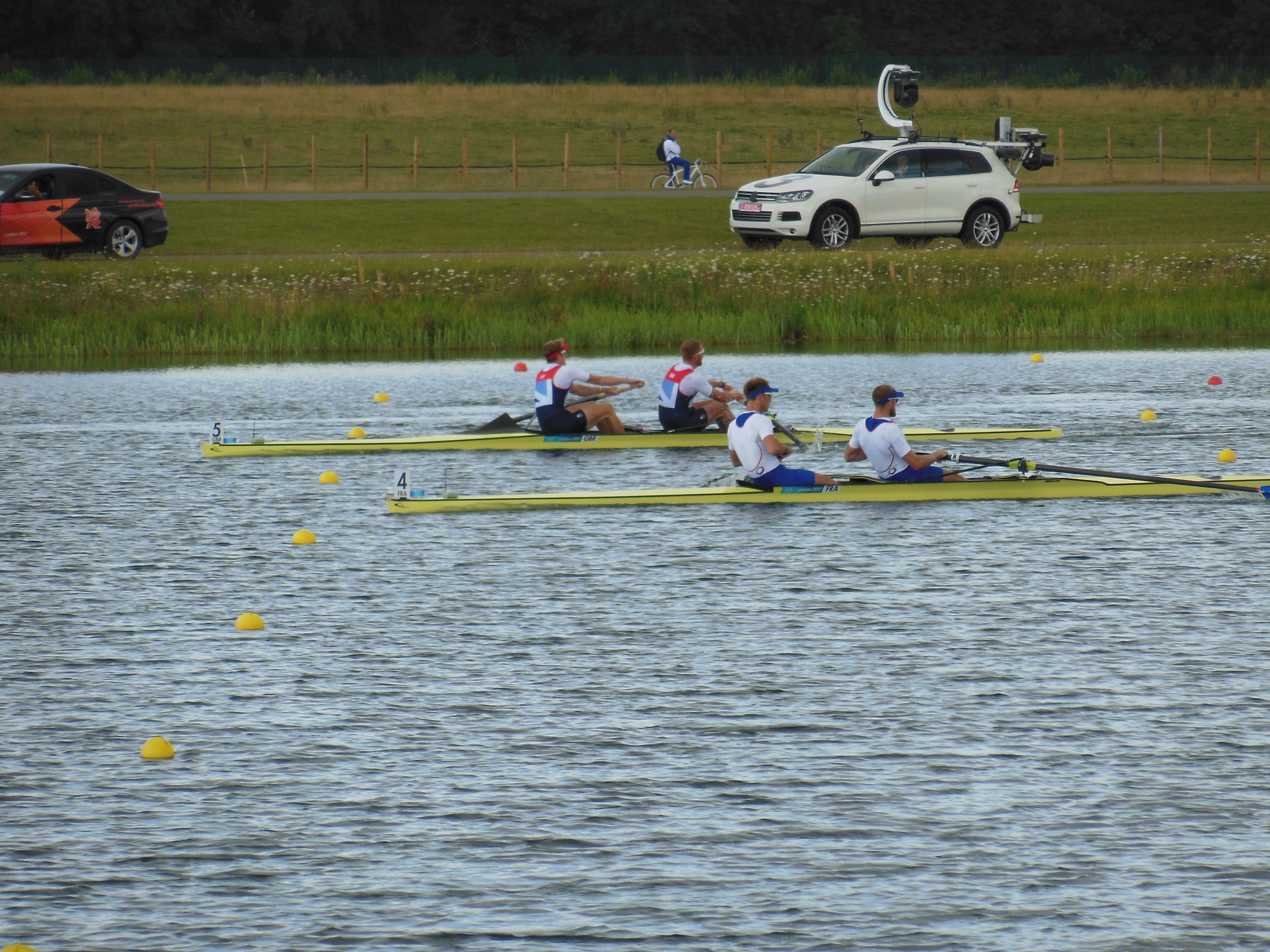
France (right boat) during the final of the men's coxless pair.

Athlete	Event	Heats		Repechage		Semifinals		Final	
Athlete	Event	Time	Rank	Time	Rank	Time	Rank	Time	Rank
Germain Chardin; Dorian Mortelette	Pair	6:17.22	2 SA/B	Bye		6:58.67	2 FA	6:21.11	2nd place, silver medalist(s)
Julien Bahain; Cédric Berrest	Double sculls	6:19.61	3 SA/B	Bye		6:29.61	5 FB	6:26.44	10
Jérémie Azou; Stany Delayre	Lightweight double sculls	6:40.89	1 SA/B	Bye		6:37.29	2 FA	6:42.69	4
Matthieu Androdias; Benjamin Chabanet; Adrien Hardy; Pierre-Jean Peltier	Quadruple sculls	5:44.25	3 SA/B	Bye		6:12.81	4 FB	6:02.12	10
Thomas Baroukh; Fabrice Moreau; Nicolas Moutton; Franck Solforosi	Lightweight four	5:50.79	1 SA/B	Bye		6:06.90	4 FB	6:08.37	7

Qualification Legend: FA=Final A (medal); FB=Final B (non-medal); FC=Final C (non-medal); FD=Final D (non-medal); FE=Final E (non-medal); FF=Final F (non-medal); SA/B=Semifinals A/B; SC/D=Semifinals C/D; SE/F=Semifinals E/F; QF=Quarterfinals; R=Repechage

== Sailing ==
France qualified one boat for each of the following events:

Men

Athlete	Event	Race											Net points	Final rank
Athlete	Event	1	2	3	4	5	6	7	8	9	10	M*	Net points	Final rank
Julien Bontemps	RS:X	~~23~~	14	2	5	5	4	17	5	8	6	4	70	5
Jean-Baptiste Bernaz	Laser	3	21	6	9	19	11	2	18	20	~~34~~	10	119	10
Jonathan Lobert	Finn	9	4	4	2	6	7	5	~~10~~	3	7	2	49	3rd place, bronze medalist(s)
Vincent Garos; Pierre Leboucher	470	9	10	11	6	10	2	~~19~~	11	4	11	16	90	7
Pierre-Alexis Ponsot; Xavier Rohart	Star	1	13	10	11	12	~~14~~	12	6	6	8	8	86	9

Women
Fleet racing

Athlete	Event	Race											Net points	Final rank
Athlete	Event	1	2	3	4	5	6	7	8	9	10	M*	Net points	Final rank
Charline Picon	RS:X	9	11	5	7	10	6	~~12~~	10	11	6	14	89	8
Sarah Steyaert	Laser Radial	21	14	19	12	11	~~26~~	10	19	22	15	EL	143	16
Mathilde Géron; Camille Lecointre	470	10	~~17~~	1	8	12	3	7	6	3	5	10	65	4

Match racing

Athlete	Event	Round Robin											Rank	Knockouts			Rank
Athlete	Event	POR	AUS	NED	SWE	USA	GBR	ESP	DEN	NZL	RUS	FIN	Rank	Q-final	S-final	Final	Rank
Élodie Bertrand; Claire Leroy; Marie Riou	Elliott 6m	W	L	W	W	L	L	L	W	W	W	L	6 Q	ESP; L (0–3)	Did not advance		6

Open

Athlete	Event	Race																Net points	Final rank
Athlete	Event	1	2	3	4	5	6	7	8	9	10	11	12	13	14	15	M*	Net points	Final rank
Stéphane Christidis; Manu Dyen	49er	1	9	9	12	1	10	12	13	10	~~21~~	2	5	10	7	14	12	127	6

M = Medal race; EL = Eliminated – did not advance into the medal race;

== Shooting ==
France earned 14 quota places for the shooting events at the 2012 Olympics:

Men

Athlete	Event	Qualification		Final	
Athlete	Event	Points	Rank	Points	Rank
Stéphane Clamens	Trap	119	19	Did not advance	
Franck Dumoulin	50 m pistol	541	33	Did not advance	
Franck Dumoulin	10 m air pistol	577	18	Did not advance	
Cyril Graff	50 m rifle 3 positions	1171	3 Q	1271.0	4
Cyril Graff	50 m rifle prone	586	46	Did not advance	
Walter Lapeyre	50 m pistol	554	21	Did not advance	
Walter Lapeyre	10 m air pistol	575	22	Did not advance	
Jérémy Monnier	10 m air rifle	592	26	Did not advance	
Pierre Edmond Piasecki	10 m air rifle	596	8 Q	699.1	6
Valérian Sauveplane	50 m rifle prone	592	22	Did not advance	
Valérian Sauveplane	50 m rifle 3 positions	1167	13	Did not advance	
Anthony Terras	Skeet	117	17	Did not advance	

Women

Athlete	Event	Qualification		Final	
Athlete	Event	Points	Rank	Points	Rank
Laurence Brize	50 m rifle 3 positions	581	18	Did not advance	
Laurence Brize	10 m air rifle	394	26	Did not advance	
Émilie Évesque	50 m rifle 3 positions	578	25	Did not advance	
Émilie Évesque	10 m air rifle	392	33	Did not advance	
Veronique Girardet	Skeet	66	10	Did not advance	
Céline Goberville	10 m air pistol	387	3 Q	486.6	2nd place, silver medalist(s)
Céline Goberville	25 m pistol	579	21	Did not advance	
Delphine Réau	Trap	72	4 Q	93 S/O 2	3rd place, bronze medalist(s)
Stéphanie Tirode	10 m air pistol	375	38	Did not advance	
Stéphanie Tirode	25 m pistol	582	14	Did not advance	

== Swimming ==
French swimmers achieved qualifying standards in the following events (up to a maximum of two swimmers in each event at the Olympic Qualifying Time (OQT), and one at the Olympic Selection Time (OST)):

Men

Athlete	Event	Heat		Semifinal		Final	
Athlete	Event	Time	Rank	Time	Rank	Time	Rank
Yannick Agnel	100 m freestyle	48.93	12 Q	48.23	7 Q	47.84	4
Yannick Agnel	200 m freestyle	1:46.60	3 Q	1:45.84	2 Q	1:43.14 NR	1st place, gold medalist(s)
Fabien Gilot	100 m freestyle	48.95	14 Q	48.49	11	Did not advance	
Damien Joly	1500 m freestyle	15:08.50	14	—N/a		Did not advance	
Camille Lacourt	100 m backstroke	53.51	4 Q	53.03	2 Q	53.08	4
Clément Lefert	100 m butterfly	53.22	29	Did not advance			
Amaury Leveaux	50 m freestyle	22.35	18	Did not advance			
Grégory Mallet	200 m freestyle	1:47.39	13 Q	1:47.56	14	Did not advance	
Florent Manaudou	50 m freestyle	22.09	=7 Q	21.80	6 Q	21.34	1st place, gold medalist(s)
Anthony Pannier	1500 m freestyle	15:24.08	20	—N/a		Did not advance	
Giacomo Perez d'Ortona	100 m breaststroke	1:00.59	17	Did not advance			
Julien Sauvage	10 km open water	—N/a				1:50:42.8	11
Benjamin Stasiulis	100 m backstroke	55.36	31	Did not advance			
Benjamin Stasiulis	200 m backstroke	1:59.52	24	Did not advance			
Yannick Agnel; Alain Bernard*; Fabien Gilot; Clément Lefert; Amaury Leveaux; Jérémy Stravius*	4 × 100 m freestyle relay	3:13.38	4 Q	—N/a		3:09.93	1st place, gold medalist(s)
Yannick Agnel; Clément Lefert; Amaury Leveaux; Grégory Mallet; Jérémy Stravius*	4 × 200 m freestyle relay	7:09.18	2 Q	—N/a		7:02.77 NR	2nd place, silver medalist(s)
Yannick Agnel; Camille Lacourt; Giacomo Perez d'Ortona; Romain Sassot	4 × 100 m medley relay	3:34.60	10	—N/a		Did not advance	

Women

Athlete	Event	Heat		Semifinal		Final	
Athlete	Event	Time	Rank	Time	Rank	Time	Rank
Ophélie Aspord	10 km open water	—N/a				1:58:43.1	6
Fanny Babou	100 m breaststroke	1:09.76	32	Did not advance			
Coralie Balmy	400 m freestyle	4:03.56	3 Q	—N/a		4:05.95	6
Coralie Balmy	800 m freestyle	8:27.15	8 Q	—N/a		8:29.26	7
Charlotte Bonnet	100 m freestyle	55.12	20	Did not advance			
Justine Bruno	100 m butterfly	1:01.14	38	Did not advance			
Alexianne Castel	100 m backstroke	1:00.16	14 Q	1:00.24	11	Did not advance	
Alexianne Castel	200 m backstroke	2:08.92	6 Q	2:08.24	5 Q	2:08.43	7
Ophélie-Cyrielle Étienne	200 m freestyle	1:59.15	18	Did not advance			
Lara Grangeon	400 m individual medley	4:44.28	18	—N/a		Did not advance	
Laure Manaudou	100 m backstroke	1:01.03	22	Did not advance			
Laure Manaudou	200 m backstroke	2:14.29	30	Did not advance			
Camille Muffat	200 m freestyle	1:58.49	12 Q	1:56.18	3 Q	1:55.58	2nd place, silver medalist(s)
Camille Muffat	400 m freestyle	4:03.29	1 Q	—N/a		4:01.45 OR	1st place, gold medalist(s)
Anna Santamans	50 m freestyle	25.23	15 Q	24.94	=10	Did not advance	
Coralie Balmy; Charlotte Bonnet; Ophélie-Cyrielle Étienne; Margaux Farrell*; Mylène Lazare*; Camille Muffat	4 × 200 m freestyle relay	7:52.88	5 Q	—N/a		7:47.49	3rd place, bronze medalist(s)
Fanny Babou; Charlotte Bonnet; Justine Bruno; Laure Manaudou	4 × 100 m medley relay	4:05.53	14	—N/a		Did not advance	

== Synchronized swimming ==
France qualified two Olympic quota places in synchronized swimming.

Athlete	Event	Technical routine		Free routine (preliminary)			Free routine (final)		
Athlete	Event	Points	Rank	Points	Total (technical + free)	Rank	Points	Total (technical + free)	Rank
Sara Labrousse; Chloé Willhelm	Duet	87.700	10	88.340	176.040	10 Q	88.560	176.260	10

== Table tennis ==
France qualified one man and two women.

Athlete	Event	Preliminary round	Round 1	Round 2	Round 3	Round 4	Quarterfinals	Semifinals	Final / BM	
Athlete	Event	Opposition Result	Opposition Result	Opposition Result	Opposition Result	Opposition Result	Opposition Result	Opposition Result	Opposition Result	Rank
Adrien Mattenet	Men's singles	Bye			Chen Wx (AUT); L 0–4	Did not advance				
Xian Yi Fang	Women's singles	Bye	Hanffou (CMR); W 4–1	Ri M-S (PRK); W 4–2	Wang Yg (SIN); L 0–4	Did not advance				
Li Xue	Women's singles	Bye		Lay (AUS); W 4–3	Shen Yf (ESP); L 0–4	Did not advance				

== Taekwondo ==
France had qualified two places in women's taekwondo.

Athlete	Event	Round of 16	Quarterfinals	Semifinals	Repechage	Bronze Medal	Final	
Athlete	Event	Opposition Result	Opposition Result	Opposition Result	Opposition Result	Opposition Result	Opposition Result	Rank
Marlène Harnois	Women's −57 kg	Contreras (CHI); W 14–3 PTG	Wahba (EGY); W 8–6	Hou Yz (CHN); L 3–8	Bye	Hamada (JPN); W 12–8	Did not advance	3rd place, bronze medalist(s)
Anne Caroline Graffe	Women's +67 kg	Mamatova (UZB); W 17–9	Lee I-J (KOR); W 7–4	Hernández (CUB); W 6–4	Bye		Mandić (SRB); L 7–9	2nd place, silver medalist(s)

== Tennis ==
France qualified six Olympic tennis players in 2012: four in the men's events and two in the women's events. France ultimately won two medals – one silver and one bronze – in the men's doubles.

Men

Athlete	Event	Round of 64	Round of 32	Round of 16	Quarterfinals	Semifinals	Final / BM	
Athlete	Event	Opposition Score	Opposition Score	Opposition Score	Opposition Score	Opposition Score	Opposition Score	Rank
Julien Benneteau	Singles	Youzhny (RUS); W 7–5, 6–3	Federer (SUI); L 2–6, 2–6	Did not advance				
Richard Gasquet	Singles	Haase (NED); W 6–3, 6–3	Baghdatis (CYP); L 4–6, 4–6	Did not advance				
Gilles Simon	Singles	Kukushkin (KAZ); W 6–4, 6–2	Dimitrov (BUL); W 6–3, 6–3	del Potro (ARG); L 1–6, 6–4, 3–6	Did not advance			
Jo-Wilfried Tsonga	Singles	Bellucci (BRA); W 6–7^{(5–7)}, 6–4, 6–4	Raonic (CAN); W 6–3, 3–6, 25–23	López (ESP); W 7–6^{(7–5)}, 6–4	Djokovic (SRB); L 4–6, 5–7	Did not advance		
Julien Benneteau; Richard Gasquet	Doubles	—N/a	Fleming / Hutchins (GBR); W 7–5, 6–3	Bhupathi / Bopanna (IND); W 6–3, 6–4	Tipsarević / Zimonjić (SRB); W 6–4, 7–6^{(7–3)}	B. Bryan / M. Bryan (USA); L 4–6, 4–6	Ferrer / F. López (ESP); W 7–6^{(7–4)}, 6–2	3rd place, bronze medalist(s)
Michaël Llodra; Jo-Wilfried Tsonga	Doubles	—N/a	Nalbandian / Schwank (ARG); W 6–3, 7–5	Paes / Vardhan (IND); W 7–6^{(7–3)}, 4–6, 6–3	Melo / Soares (BRA); W 6–4, 6–2	Ferrer / F. López (ESP); W 3–6, 6–4, 18–16	B. Bryan / M. Bryan (USA); L 4–6, 6–7^{(2–7)}	2nd place, silver medalist(s)

Women

Athlete	Event	Round of 64	Round of 32	Round of 16	Quarterfinals	Semifinals	Final / BM	
Athlete	Event	Opposition Score	Opposition Score	Opposition Score	Opposition Score	Opposition Score	Opposition Score	Rank
Alizé Cornet	Singles	Paszek (AUT); W 7–6^{(7–4)}, 6–4	Hantuchová (SVK); L 3–6, 0–6	Did not advance				
Alizé Cornet; Kristina Mladenovic	Doubles	—N/a	Peng / Zheng (CHN); L 1–6, 7–6^{(7–3)}, 3–6	Did not advance				

== Triathlon ==
France qualified the following triathletes:

Athlete	Event	Swim (1.5 km)	Trans 1	Bike (40 km)	Trans 2	Run (10 km)	Total Time	Rank
David Hauss	Men's	17:24	0:38	58:50	0:29	29:53	1:47:14	4
Vincent Luis	Men's	17:20	0:38	58:53	0:27	31:00	1:48:18	11
Laurent Vidal	Men's	17:27	0:43	58:42	0:28	30:01	1:47:21	5
Emmie Charayron	Women's	19:48	0:39	1:06:58	0:34	34:27	2:02:26	18
Jessica Harrison	Women's	18:39	0:43	1:06:16	0:31	35:13	2:01:22	9
Carole Péon	Women's	19:30	0:45	1:07:11	0:33	35:59	2:03:58	29

== Weightlifting ==
France qualified three men and one woman.

Athlete	Event	Snatch		Clean & Jerk		Total	Rank
Athlete	Event	Result	Rank	Result	Rank	Total	Rank
Vencelas Dabaya	Men's −69 kg	~~135~~	DNF	—	—	—	DNF
Bernardin Kingue Matam	Men's −69 kg	~~143~~	DNF	—	—	—	DNF
Benjamin Hennequin	Men's −85 kg	~~163~~	DNF	—	—	—	DNF
Mélanie Bardis	Women's −48 kg	73	9	93	9	166	10

== Wrestling ==
France qualified six quota places:

Key:

- VT – Victory by Fall.
- PP – Decision by Points – the loser with technical points.
- PO – Decision by Points – the loser without technical points.

Men's freestyle

Athlete	Event	Qualification	Round of 16	Quarterfinal	Semifinal	Repechage 1	Repechage 2	Final / BM	
Athlete	Event	Opposition Result	Opposition Result	Opposition Result	Opposition Result	Opposition Result	Opposition Result	Opposition Result	Rank
Didier Pais	−60 kg	Bye	Madany (EGY); L 1–3 ^{PP}	Did not advance					11

Men's Greco-Roman

Athlete	Event	Qualification	Round of 16	Quarterfinal	Semifinal	Repechage 1	Repechage 2	Final / BM	
Athlete	Event	Opposition Result	Opposition Result	Opposition Result	Opposition Result	Opposition Result	Opposition Result	Opposition Result	Rank
Tarik Belmadani	−60 kg	Bye	Ala-Huikku (FIN); W 3–0 ^{PO}	Matsumoto (JPN); L 0–3 ^{PO}	Did not advance				9
Steeve Guénot	−66 kg	Bye	Rivas (VEN); W 3–0 ^{PO}	Abdevali (IRI); W 3–0 ^{PO}	Kim H-W (KOR); L 1–3 ^{PP}	Bye		Mulens (CUB); W 3–0 ^{PO}	3rd place, bronze medalist(s)
Christophe Guénot	−74 kg	Bye	Ayet Ikram (TUN); W 3–0 ^{PO}	Vlasov (RUS); L 1–3 ^{PP}	Did not advance	Madsen (DEN); L 1–3 ^{PP}	Did not advance		8
Mélonin Noumonvi	−84 kg	Bye	Hietaniemi (FIN); W 3–0 ^{PO}	Gaber (EGY); L 1–3 ^{PO}	Did not advance	Bye	Žugaj (CRO); W 3–0 ^{PO}	Janikowski (POL); L 0–3 ^{PO}	5

Women's freestyle

Athlete	Event	Qualification	Round of 16	Quarterfinal	Semifinal	Repechage 1	Repechage 2	Final / BM	
Athlete	Event	Opposition Result	Opposition Result	Opposition Result	Opposition Result	Opposition Result	Opposition Result	Opposition Result	Rank
Cynthia Vescan	−72 kg	Bye	Saenko (MDA); L 1–3 ^{PP}	Did not advance					12
