= 2012 European Short Course Swimming Championships =

Water sport competitions

- Host city: Chartres, France
- Date(s): 22–25 November 2012
- Venue(s): L'Odyssee
- Events: 40

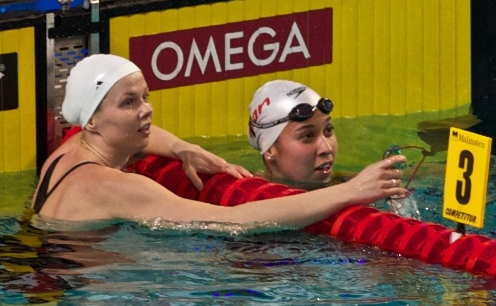
Ranomi Kromowidjojo and Britta Steffen 2010 closeup

The 2012 European Short Course Swimming Championships was held in Chartres, France, from November 22 to 25, 2012.

The event was held over four days with heats, semifinals and a final for the 50 m and 100 m events and heats and a final for all other events with the exception of the women's 800 m and men's 1500 m freestyle which are heat declared winners. Heats were held in the morning, with semifinals, finals and the fastest heat of the distance freestyle events in the evening.

Each nation was permitted to enter four swimmers into each individual event, however only the fastest two were able to progress to the semifinal and/or final.

== Medal summary ==
=== Men's events ===
Event	Gold		Silver		Bronze	
50 m freestyle	Florent Manaudou; France	20.70	Vladimir Morozov; Russia	20.89	Frédérick Bousquet; France	20.97
100 m freestyle	Vladimir Morozov; Russia	45.68	Yevgeny Lagunov; Russia	46.52	Yannick Agnel; France	46.80
200 m freestyle	Yannick Agnel; France	1:41.46	Pieter Timmers; Belgium	1:43.08 NR	Grégory Mallet; France	1:43.21
400 m freestyle	Yannick Agnel; France	3:37.54	Gabriele Detti; Italy	3:41.66	Andrea Mitchell D'Arrigo; Italy	3:42.32
1500 m freestyle	Gregorio Paltrinieri; Italy	14:27.78	Serhiy Frolov; Ukraine	14:30.87 NR	Anthony Pannier; France	14:41.97
50 m backstroke	Jérémy Stravius; France	23.28	Guy Barnea; Israel	23.46 NR	Vladimir Morozov; Russia	23.47
100 m backstroke	Jérémy Stravius; France	49.70	Benjamin Stasiulis; France	50.31	Damiano Lestingi; Italy	51.35
200 m backstroke	Radosław Kawęcki; Poland	1:48.51 CR, NR	Péter Bernek; Hungary	1:49.41 NR	Benjamin Stasiulis; France	1:51.81
50 m breaststroke	Fabio Scozzoli; Italy	26.18	Aleksander Hetland; Norway	26.20	Damir Dugonjič; Slovenia	26.24, NR
100 m breaststroke	Fabio Scozzoli; Italy	57.25	Martti Aljand; Estonia	57.75	Giacomo Perez d'Ortona; France	57.76
200 m breaststroke	Viatcheslav Sinkevich; Russia	2:04.55	Ihor Borysyk; Ukraine	2:05.12	Andriy Kovalenko; Ukraine	2:05.21
50 m butterfly	Rafael Muñoz; Spain	22.53	Frédérick Bousquet; France	22.54	Andriy Govorov; Ukraine	22.72
100 m butterfly	Yevgeny Korotyshkin; Russia	49.98	Rafael Muñoz; Spain	50.39	Mehdy Metella; France	50.66
200 m butterfly	László Cseh; Hungary	1:52.11	Viktor Bromer; Denmark	1:53.38	Joeri Verlinden; Netherlands	1:53.47
100 m individual medley	Vladimir Morozov; Russia	51.89	Peter Mankoč; Slovenia	52.64	Martti Aljand; Estonia	52.92 NR
200 m individual medley	László Cseh; Hungary	1:52.74 NR	Jérémy Stravius; France	1:54.00 NR	Gal Nevo; Israel	1:55.14
400 m individual medley	László Cseh; Hungary	4:00.99	Dávid Verrasztó; Hungary	4:02.54	Gal Nevo; Israel	4:04.80
4 × 50 m freestyle relay	France; Florent Manaudou (20.83); Frédérick Bousquet (20.65); Jérémy Stravius (21.00); Amaury Leveaux (20.83); Joris Hustache^{[a]} Grégory Mallet^{[a]} Mehdy Metella^{[a]}	1:23.31	Russia; Vladimir Morozov (20.78); Andrey Grechin (21.21); Yevgeny Lagunov (20.84); Vitaly Syrnikov (21.16); Evgeny Korotyshkin^{[a]}	1:23.99 NR	Belgium; Emmanuel Vanluchene (21.75); Pieter Timmers (21.27); Yoris Grandjean (21.58); Jasper Aerents (21.00); Stijn Depypere^{[a]}	1:25.60 NR
4 × 50 m medley relay	France; Jérémy Stravius (23.47); Giacomo Perez d'Ortona (26.12); Frédérick Bousquet (22.58); Florent Manaudou (20.18); Dorian Gandin^{[a]} Romain Sassot^{[a]} Grégory Mallet^{[a]}	1:32.35	Russia; Vladimir Morozov (23.59); Oleg Utekhin (26.50); Yevgeny Korotyshkin (22.52); Yevgeny Lagunov (21.26); Vitaly Syrnikov^{[a]}	1:33.87	Czech Republic; Martin Baďura (24.51); Petr Bartůněk (26.70); Michal Ledl (22.97); Tomáš Plevko (21.00)	1:35.18

Legend: WR - World record; WBT - World best time; ER - European record; NR - National record; CR - Championship record

^{a} Swimmers who participated in the heats only and received medals.

=== Women's events ===
Event	Gold		Silver		Bronze	
50 m freestyle	Aleksandra Gerasimenya; Belarus	23.85 NR	Triin Aljand; Estonia	24.24	Jeanette Ottesen; Denmark	24.24
100 m freestyle	Veronika Popova; Russia	52.86 NR	Jeanette Ottesen; Denmark	53.13	Charlotte Bonnet; France	53.23
200 m freestyle	Camille Muffat; France	1:52.20	Charlotte Bonnet; France	1:54.00	Veronika Popova; Russia	1:54.20
400 m freestyle	Camille Muffat; France	3:54.85 WR	Lotte Friis; Denmark	3:58.85	Coralie Balmy; France	3:59.80
800 m freestyle	Lotte Friis; Denmark	8:10.24	Hannah Miley; Great Britain	8:15.66	Aimee Willmott; Great Britain	8:18.90
50 m backstroke	Laure Manaudou; France	26.78 NR	Sanja Jovanović; Croatia	26.84	Simona Baumrtová; Czech Republic	26.97
100 m backstroke	Daryna Zevina; Ukraine	57.07	Laure Manaudou; France	57.70	Simona Baumrtová; Czech Republic	58.08
200 m backstroke	Daryna Zevina; Ukraine	2:01.97 NR, CR	Alexianne Castel; France	2:03.23	Simona Baumrtová; Czech Republic	2:03.43 NR
50 m breaststroke	Petra Chocová; Czech Republic	30.02 =NR	Rikke Møller Pedersen; Denmark	30.25	Sycerika McMahon; Ireland	30.34 NR
100 m breaststroke	Rikke Møller Pedersen; Denmark	1:04.12 NR, CR	Petra Chocová; Czech Republic	1:05.50 NR	Marina García Urzainqui; Spain	1:05.82 NR
200 m breaststroke	Rikke Møller Pedersen; Denmark	2:17.26	Marina García Urzainqui; Spain	2:20.57 NR	Hanna Dzerkal; Ukraine	2:21.94 NR
50 m butterfly	Jeanette Ottesen; Denmark	25.21	Aleksandra Gerasimenya; Belarus	25.53 NR	Mélanie Henique; France	25.76
100 m butterfly	Ilaria Bianchi; Italy	56.40 NR	Kimberly Buys; Belgium	57.00 NR	Jeanette Ottesen; Denmark	57.13
200 m butterfly	Katinka Hosszú; Hungary	2:05.78	Stefania Pirozzi; Italy	2:06.09	Alessia Polieri; Italy	2:06.63
100 m individual medley	Katinka Hosszú; Hungary	58.83	Zsuzsanna Jakabos; Hungary	59.15	Siobhan-Marie O'Connor; Great Britain	59.72
200 m individual medley	Katinka Hosszú; Hungary	2:05.78	Hannah Miley; Great Britain	2:06.21 NR	Zsuzsanna Jakabos; Hungary	2:06.66
400 m individual medley	Hannah Miley; Great Britain	4:23.47 ER	Katinka Hosszú; Hungary	4:23.91 NR	Zsuzsanna Jakabos; Hungary	4:25.61
4 × 50 m freestyle relay	Denmark; Jeanette Ottesen (24.34); Kelly Riber Rasmussen (24.59); Julie Levisen (24.73); Pernille Blume (24.44)	1:38.10	Finland; Emilia Pikkarainen (25.09); Lotta Nevalainen (24.29); Laura Kurki (24.21); Hanna-Maria Seppälä (24.54)	1:38.13 NR	Belarus; Yuliya Khitraya (25.12); Aleksandra Gerasimenya (23.68); Oksana Demidova (25.10); Sviatlana Khakhlova (24.49)	1:38.39 NR
4 × 50 m medley relay	Denmark; Kristina Thomsen (28.16); Rikke Møller Pedersen (29.83); Jeanette Ottesen (25.10); Pernille Blume (24.32)	1:47.41	Czech Republic; Simona Baumrtová (26.98); Petra Chocová (29.34); Lucie Svěcená (26.59); Aneta Pechancová (24.76); Barbora Závadová^{[b]}	1:47.67	France; Laure Manaudou (27.04); Fanny Babou (31.01); Mélanie Henique (25.33); Anna Santamans (24.32); Béryl Gastaldello^{[b]}	1:47.70

Legend: WR - World record; WBT - World best time; ER - European record; NR - National record; CR - Championship record

^{b} Swimmers who participated in the heats only and received medals.

=== Mixed events ===
Event	Gold		Silver		Bronze	
4 × 50 m freestyle relay	France; Frédérick Bousquet (20.97); Florent Manaudou (20.35); Camille Muffat (24.39); Anna Santamans (23.93); Amaury Leveaux^{[c]} Mehdy Metella^{[c]} Charlotte Bonnet^{[c]} Béryl Gastaldello^{[c]}	1:29.64	Russia; Andrey Grechin (21.53); Vladimir Morozov (20.45); Veronika Popova (24.07); Rozaliya Nasretdinova (24.36); Vitaly Syrnikov^{[c]}	1:30.41	Finland; Hanna-Maria Seppälä (24.74); Laura Kurki (24.11); Andrei Tuomola (21.72); Ari-Pekka Liukkonen (21.17); Lotta Nevalainen^{[c]}	1:31.74
4 × 50 m medley relay	France; Jérémy Stravius (23.13); Florent Manaudou (25.90); Mélanie Henique (25.61); Anna Santamans (24.10); Cloé Credeville^{[c]} Justine Bruno^{[c]} Frédérick Bousquet^{[c]}	1:38.74	Slovenia; Anja Čarman (27.19); Damir Dugonjič (25.57); Peter Mankoč (22.20); Nastja Govejšek (24.83)	1:39.79	Norway; Lavrans Solli (24.08); Aleksander Hetland (25.78); Monica Johannessen (26.06); Cecilie Johannessen (24.18)	1:40.10

^{c} Swimmers who participated in the heats only and received medals.

== Medal table ==
* Host nation (France)

Rank	Nation	Gold	Silver	Bronze	Total
1	France (FRA)*	12	6	11	29
2	Denmark (DEN)	6	4	2	12
2	Hungary (HUN)	6	4	2	12
4	Russia (RUS)	5	5	2	12
5	Italy (ITA)	4	2	3	9
6	Ukraine (UKR)	2	2	3	7
7	Czech Republic (CZE)	1	2	4	7
8	Great Britain (GBR)	1	2	2	5
9	Spain (ESP)	1	2	1	4
10	Belarus (BLR)	1	1	1	3
11	Poland (POL)	1	0	0	1
12	Belgium (BEL)	0	2	1	3
12	Estonia (EST)	0	2	1	3
12	Slovenia (SLO)	0	2	1	3
15	Israel (ISR)	0	1	2	3
16	Finland (FIN)	0	1	1	2
16	Norway (NOR)	0	1	1	2
18	Croatia (CRO)	0	1	0	1
19	Ireland (IRL)	0	0	1	1
19	Netherlands (NED)	0	0	1	1
Totals (20 entries)		40	40	40	120
