= Justine Bruno =

French swimmer

Personal information
- Born: 17 February 1994 (age 32) Beauvais, France
- Height: 174 cm (5 ft 9 in)
- Weight: 63 kg (139 lb)

Sport
- Country: France
- Sport: Swimming
Medal record
Women's swimming
Representing France
European Championships (SC)
Gold medal – first place	2012 Chartres	4×50 m mixed medley

Justine Bruno (born 17 February 1994) is a French swimmer who competes in the Women's 100 metre butterfly. At the 2012 Summer Olympics she finished 38th overall in the heats in the Women's 100 metre butterfly and failed to reach the final.
