= Fanny Babou =

French swimmer

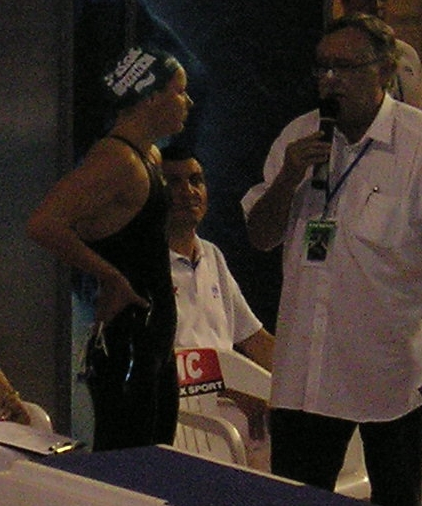
- Michel Salles interviewing the champion and record woman from France, Fanny Babou at the French Swimming Championship, Montpellier 2009

Personal information
- Born: 26 March 1989 (age 37) Perpignan, France
- Height: 164 cm (5 ft 5 in) (2012)
- Weight: 54 kg (119 lb) (2012)
Medal record
Women's swimming
Representing France
European Championships (SC)
Bronze medal – third place	2012 Chartres	4×50 m medley

Fanny Babou (born 26 March 1989) is a French swimmer. She competed for France at the 2012 Summer Olympics in the 100 metres breaststroke and the 4×100 metres medley relay.

During the London 2012 Olympics Babou, became a gag on the Chris Moyles Breakfast show, even with her own jingle.
