= Pierre Edmond Piasecki =

French sports shooter

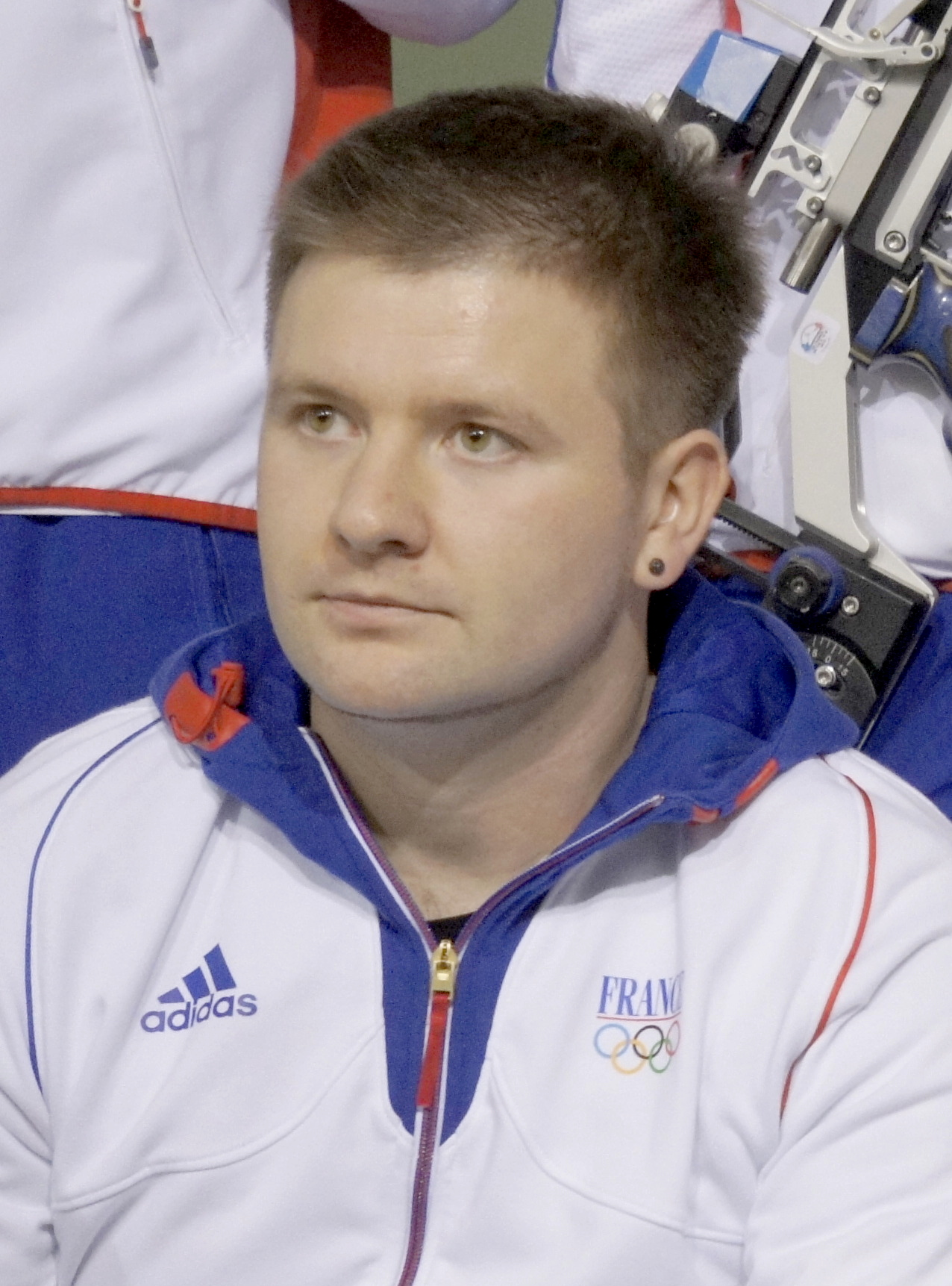
- Piasecki in 2013

Personal information
- Born: 3 June 1985 (age 41) Metz, France

Sport
- Sport: Sports shooting
- Club: Harthouse-Haguenau Shooting Society
- Coached by: Gilles Muller (national); Maxym Lasalle, Pascal Bessy

Pierre Edmond Piasecki (born 3 June 1985) is a French sports shooter. He placed sixth in the 10 metre air rifle event at the 2012 Summer Olympics. He works as a customs officer.
