= Grégory Mallet =

French swimmer

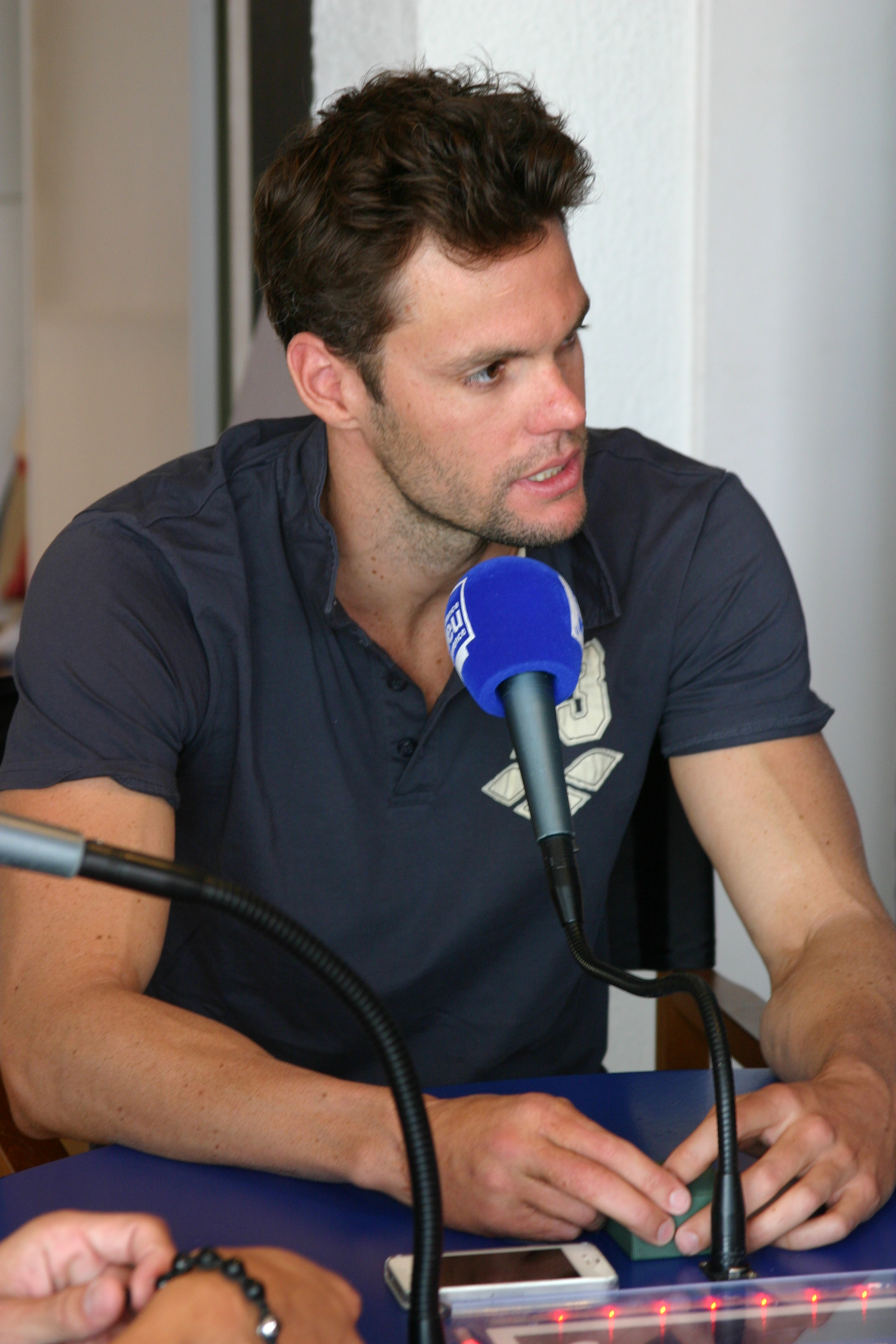

Personal information
- Nationality: France
- Born: 21 March 1984 (age 42) Rueil-Malmaison, France
- Height: 1.96 m (6 ft 5 in)

Sport
- Sport: Swimming
- Strokes: Freestyle
- Club: CN Marseille
Medal record
Men's swimming
Representing France
Olympic Games
Silver medal – second place	2008 Beijing	4x100 m freestyle
Silver medal – second place	2012 London	4×200 m freestyle
World Championships (LC)
Silver medal – second place	2011 Shanghai	4 × 200 m freestyle
Bronze medal – third place	2009 Rome	4×100 m freestyle
European Championships (LC)
Bronze medal – third place	2006 Budapest	4×100 m freestyle
Bronze medal – third place	2014 Berlin	4×100 m mixed freestyle
European Championships (SC)
Gold medal – first place	2012 Chartres	4×50 m freestyle
Gold medal – first place	2012 Chartres	4×50 m medley
Bronze medal – third place	2012 Chartres	200 m freestyle

Grégory Mallet (born 21 March 1984) is a French Olympic swimmer.

== Career ==
Mallet swam for France at the 2008 Olympics, where he was part of France's silver-medal winning 4 × 100 m freestyle relay after he swam in the preliminary heats. At the 2012 Summer Olympics he also swam in the final of the men's 4 × 200 m freestyle relay to help France win the silver medal.
