= 2016 FIBA World Olympic Qualifying Tournament for Women squads =

This article displays the squads of the teams that competed in 2016 FIBA World Olympic Qualifying Tournament for Women. Each team consists of 12 players.

== Group A ==
=== Cuba ===
Cuba women's national basketball team - 2016 Olympic Qualifying Tournament roster
Players
Coaches

| Pos. | No. | Name | Age – Date of birth | Height | Club |
|---|---|---|---|---|---|---|
| F | 4 | Fransy Ochoa | 25 – 13 September 1990 | 1.80 m (5 ft 11 in) | Sancti Spiritus | (Cuba) |
| G | 5 | Ineidis Casanova | 27 – 13 October 1988 | 1.70 m (5 ft 7 in) | Santiago de Cuba | (Cuba) |
| F | 6 | Anisleidy Galindo | 26 – 21 September 1989 | 1.80 m (5 ft 11 in) | Pinar del Rio | (Cuba) |
| G | 7 | Oyanaisy Gelis | 32 – 21 October 1983 | 1.75 m (5 ft 9 in) | Santiago de Cuba | (Cuba) |
| G | 8 | Arlenys Romero | 32 – 7 February 1984 | 1.76 m (5 ft 9 in) | Pinar del Rio | (Cuba) |
| G | 9 | Lisdeyvi Martinez | 27 – 23 September 1988 | 1.75 m (5 ft 9 in) | Capitalinas | (Cuba) |
| C | 10 | Arlety Povea | 31 – 7 October 1984 | 1.82 m (6 ft 0 in) | Pinar del Rio | (Cuba) |
| C | 11 | Marlen Cepeda | 30 – 27 October 1985 | 1.85 m (6 ft 1 in) | Sancti Spiritus | (Cuba) |
| PF | 12 | Clenia Noblet | 29 – 6 May 1987 | 1.85 m (6 ft 1 in) | Guantanamo | (Cuba) |
| F | 13 | Edith Thompson | 25 – 21 December 1990 | 1.82 m (6 ft 0 in) | Capitalinas | (Cuba) |
| G | 14 | Leidys Oquendo | 33 – 23 July 1982 | 1.78 m (5 ft 10 in) | Camaguey | (Cuba) |
| F | 15 | Suchitel Avila | 33 – 1 September 1982 | 1.80 m (5 ft 11 in) | Capitalinas | (Cuba) |

Head coach

- Alberto Zabala

Assistant coach(es)

- Eduardo Moya

Legend

- Club – describes last played
  club before the tournament
- Age – describes age
  on 13 June 2016

Source
fiba.com

=== France ===
France women's national basketball team - 2016 Olympic Qualifying Tournament roster
Players
Coaches

| Pos. | No. | Name | Age – Date of birth | Height | Club |
|---|---|---|---|---|---|---|
| C | 4 | Isabelle Yacoubou (C) | 30 – 21 April 1986 | 1.90 m (6 ft 3 in) | Familia Schio | (Italy) |
| C | 5 | Endéné Miyem | 28 – 15 May 1988 | 1.88 m (6 ft 2 in) | Dynamo Kursk | (Russia) |
| C | 7 | Sandrine Gruda | 29 – 25 June 1987 | 1.93 m (6 ft 4 in) | UMMC Ekaterinburg | (Russia) |
| F | 10 | Sarah Michel | 27 – 10 January 1989 | 1.80 m (5 ft 11 in) | Basket Lattes | (France) |
| SF | 11 | Valériane Ayayi | 22 – 29 April 1994 | 1.84 m (6 ft 0 in) | Basket Lattes | (France) |
| C | 12 | Gaëlle Skrela | 33 – 24 January 1983 | 1.77 m (5 ft 10 in) | Basket Lattes | (France) |
| C | 16 | Héléna Ciak | 26 – 15 December 1989 | 1.97 m (6 ft 6 in) | CJM Bourges Basket | (France) |
| G | 17 | Marine Johannès | 21 – 21 January 1995 | 1.77 m (5 ft 10 in) | USO Mondeville | (France) |
| PG | 20 | Amel Bouderra | 27 – 26 March 1989 | 1.63 m (5 ft 4 in) | Flammes Carolo Basket | (France) |
| F | 21 | Laetitia Kamba | 29 – 10 January 1987 | 1.87 m (6 ft 2 in) | ESB Villeneuve-d'Ascq | (France) |
| G | 22 | Olivia Époupa | 22 – 30 April 1994 | 1.64 m (5 ft 5 in) | Toulouse Métropole Basket | (France) |
| C | 25 | Marielle Amant | 26 – 9 December 1989 | 1.90 m (6 ft 3 in) | ESB Villeneuve-d’Ascq | (France) |

Head coach

- Valérie Garnier

Assistant coach(es)

- Grégory Halin
- Olivier Lafargue
- Marcus Friesen

Legend

- Club – describes last played
  club before the tournament
- Age – describes age
  on 13 June 2016

Source
fiba.com

=== New Zealand ===
New Zealand women's national basketball team - 2016 Olympic Qualifying Tournament roster
Players
Coaches

| Pos. | No. | Name | Age – Date of birth | Height | Club |
|---|---|---|---|---|---|---|
| SG | 1 | Erin Rooney | 25 – 3 September 1990 | 1.73 m (5 ft 8 in) | COB Calais | (France) |
| PG | 2 | Micaela Cocks | 30 – 2 May 1986 | 1.74 m (5 ft 9 in) | Townsville Fire | (Australia) |
| SF | 4 | Kalani Purcell | 21 – 13 January 1995 | 1.85 m (6 ft 1 in) | Brigham Young University | (United States) |
| SG | 5 | Chevannah Paalvast | 24 – 4 September 1991 | 1.80 m (5 ft 11 in) | Townsville Fire | (Australia) |
| PG | 6 | Jordan Hunter | 25 – 20 August 1990 | 1.72 m (5 ft 8 in) | Auckland Counties Manukau | (New Zealand) |
| SG | 7 | Antonia Edmondson | 29 – 10 May 1987 | 1.81 m (5 ft 11 in) | Perth Lynx | (Australia) |
| SF | 9 | Stella Beck | 20 – 25 September 1995 | 1.79 m (5 ft 10 in) | Saint Mary's College of California | (United States) |
| SF | 10 | Lisa Wallbutton | 30 – 14 January 1986 | 1.83 m (6 ft 0 in) | Perth Redbacks | (Australia) |
| C | 12 | Penina Davidson | 20 – 2 September 1995 | 1.91 m (6 ft 3 in) | University of California | (United States) |
| C | 13 | Josephine Stockill | 22 – 29 December 1993 | 1.85 m (6 ft 1 in) | Colgate University | (United States) |
| SF | 15 | Deena Franklin | 21 – 5 February 1995 | 1.86 m (6 ft 1 in) | Waitakere Lady Rangers | (New Zealand) |
| SF | 22 | Jillian Harmon | 29 – 3 March 1987 | 1.85 m (6 ft 1 in) | Le Mura Lucca | (Italy) |

Head coach

- Kennedy Kereama

Assistant coach(es)

- Aik Ho
- Chris Lucas

Legend

- Club – describes last played
  club before the tournament
- Age – describes age
  on 13 June 2016

Source
fiba.com

== Group B ==
=== Argentina ===
Argentina women's national basketball team - 2016 Olympic Qualifying Tournament roster
Players
Coaches

| Pos. | No. | Name | Age – Date of birth | Height | Club |
|---|---|---|---|---|---|---|
| F | 4 | Macarena Rosset | 25 – 23 February 1991 | 1.74 m (5 ft 9 in) | Bonfiglioli Ferrara | (Italy) |
| C | 5 | Ornella Santana | 25 – 17 September 1990 | 1.80 m (5 ft 11 in) | Deportivo Berazategui | (Argentina) |
| PF | 6 | Victoria Llorente | 20 – 5 June 1996 | 1.85 m (6 ft 1 in) | Gernika Bizkaia | (Spain) |
| F | 7 | Diana Cabrera | 22 – 7 August 1993 | 1.85 m (6 ft 1 in) | Union Florida | (Argentina) |
| SF | 8 | Andrea Boquete | 25 – 24 September 1990 | 1.80 m (5 ft 11 in) | Deportivo Berazategui | (Argentina) |
| C | 9 | Celia Fiorotto | 24 – 2 June 1992 | 1.83 m (6 ft 0 in) | Santa Maria | (Ecuador) |
| PF | 10 | Agostina Burani | 24 – 4 October 1991 | 1.86 m (6 ft 1 in) | Atletico Lanus | (Argentina) |
| PG | 11 | Melissa Gretter | 23 – 24 January 1993 | 1.67 m (5 ft 6 in) | Corinthians/Americana | (Brazil) |
| G | 12 | Sandra Pavón | 31 – 1 June 1985 | 1.79 m (5 ft 10 in) | Velez Sarsfield | (Argentina) |
| SF | 13 | Débora González | 26 – 10 January 1990 | 1.70 m (5 ft 7 in) | Passalacqua | (Italy) |
| C | 17 | Gisela Vega | 34 – 14 March 1982 | 1.85 m (6 ft 1 in) | Gernika Bizkaia | (Spain) |
| F | 21 | Sthefany Thomas | 27 – 4 May 1989 | 1.75 m (5 ft 9 in) | Uruguay Unemi | (Ecuador) |

Head coach

- Christian Santander

Assistant coach(es)

- Carlos Osvaldo Gomez
- Sebastian Alfredo Silva

Legend

- Club – describes last played
  club before the tournament
- Age – describes age
  on 13 June 2016

Source
fiba.com

=== Cameroon ===
Cameroon women's national basketball team - 2016 Olympic Qualifying Tournament roster
Players
Coaches

| Pos. | No. | Name | Age – Date of birth | Height | Club |
|---|---|---|---|---|---|---|
| C | 4 | Brittany Starling | 22 – 26 January 1994 | 1.81 m (5 ft 11 in) | Upstate South Carolina University | (United States) |
| PG | 5 | Priscilla Mbiandja | 27 – 22 February 1989 | 1.73 m (5 ft 8 in) | INJS Basketball | (Cameroon) |
| PG | 6 | Tia Weledji | 20 – 8 March 1996 | 1.78 m (5 ft 10 in) | Princeton University | (United States) |
| C | 7 | Rose Abenkou | 21 – 25 July 1994 | 1.86 m (6 ft 1 in) | Poinçonnet | (France) |
| PG | 8 | Nelly Weledji | 22 – 14 August 1993 | 1.78 m (5 ft 10 in) | Brown University | (United States) |
| G | 9 | Ramses Lonlack | 27 – 20 January 1989 | 1.75 m (5 ft 9 in) | Instituto Fertilidad Air Europa | (Spain) |
| SF | 10 | Monique Ngo Ndjock | 30 – 8 October 1985 | 1.88 m (6 ft 2 in) | Passalacqua Ragusa | (Italy) |
| F | 11 | Marie Ange Mfoula | 24 – 31 May 1992 | 1.88 m (6 ft 2 in) | Poinçonnet | (France) |
| C | 12 | Maeva Dongmo Teinkela | 23 – 18 February 1993 | 1.94 m (6 ft 4 in) | Hofstra University | (United States) |
| C | 13 | Larissa Mbong | 25 – 15 August 1990 | 1.86 m (6 ft 1 in) | Union Sportive Aussarienne | (Algeria) |
| SF | 14 | Catherine Ghane Yenou | 28 – 21 July 1987 | 1.75 m (5 ft 9 in) | Union Sportive Aussarienne | (Algeria) |
| F | 15 | Jolene Tamboue Makwegat | 26 – 11 December 1989 | 1.80 m (5 ft 11 in) | Georgia Lina Hurricane | (United States) |

Head coach

- Stefano Bizzozi

Assistant coach(es)

- Willy Assembe
- Guy Moudio

Legend

- Club – describes last played
  club before the tournament
- Age – describes age
  on 13 June 2016

Source
fiba.com

=== Turkey ===
Turkey women's national basketball team - 2016 Olympic Qualifying Tournament roster
Players
Coaches

| Pos. | No. | Name | Age – Date of birth | Height | Club |
|---|---|---|---|---|---|---|
| PG | 4 | Olcay Cakir | 22 – 13 July 1993 | 1.82 m (6 ft 0 in) | Fenerbahçe | (Turkey) |
| PF | 5 | Tugce Canitez | 25 – 10 November 1990 | 1.88 m (6 ft 2 in) | Fenerbahçe | (Turkey) |
| SF | 6 | Pinar Demirok | 24 – 6 August 1991 | 1.82 m (6 ft 0 in) | Abdullah Gul | (Turkey) |
| PG | 7 | Birsel Vardarli | 31 – 12 July 1984 | 1.75 m (5 ft 9 in) | Fenerbahçe | (Turkey) |
| PF | 8 | Sebnem Kimyacioglu | 32 – 14 June 1983 | 1.82 m (6 ft 0 in) | Yakin Dogu | (Turkey) |
| PF | 9 | Bahar Caglar | 27 – 28 September 1988 | 1.90 m (6 ft 3 in) | Galatasaray | (Turkey) |
| PG | 10 | Isil Alben | 30 – 22 February 1986 | 1.72 m (5 ft 8 in) | Galatasaray | (Turkey) |
| C | 11 | Nevriye Yilmaz | 35 – 16 June 1980 | 1.92 m (6 ft 4 in) | Galatasaray | (Turkey) |
| C | 12 | Lara Sanders | 29 – 11 September 1986 | 1.91 m (6 ft 3 in) | Abdullah Gul | (Turkey) |
| SG | 13 | Ayse Cora | 23 – 3 March 1993 | 1.75 m (5 ft 9 in) | Besiktas | (Turkey) |
| F | 14 | Saziye Ivegin | 34 – 8 February 1982 | 1.80 m (5 ft 11 in) | Besiktas | (Turkey) |
| PF | 15 | Tilbe Şenyürek | 21 – 26 April 1995 | 1.89 m (6 ft 2 in) | Botasspor | (Turkey) |

Head coach

- Ekrem Memnun

Assistant coach(es)

- Aziz Akkaya
- Murat Bilge

Legend

- Club – describes last played
  club before the tournament
- Age – describes age
  on 13 June 2016

Source
fiba.com

== Group C ==
=== Belarus ===
Belarus women's national basketball team - 2016 Olympic Qualifying Tournament roster
Players
Coaches

| Pos. | No. | Name | Age – Date of birth | Height | Club |
|---|---|---|---|---|---|---|
| F | 4 | Maryia Papova | 21 – 13 July 1994 | 1.89 m (6 ft 2 in) | Enisey Krasnoyarski Kraj | (Russia) |
| SF | 6 | Katsiaryna Snytsina | 30 – 2 September 1985 | 1.88 m (6 ft 2 in) | Hatay BSB | (Turkey) |
| SG | 8 | Tatsiana Likhtarovich | 28 – 29 March 1988 | 1.80 m (5 ft 11 in) | Aluinvent DVTK | (Hungary) |
| PG | 9 | Volha Ziuzkova | 32 – 14 June 1983 | 1.71 m (5 ft 7 in) | BK Tsmoki-Minsk | (Belarus) |
| C | 10 | Anastasiya Verameyenka | 28 – 10 July 1987 | 1.92 m (6 ft 4 in) | Fenerbahçe | (Turkey) |
| C | 11 | Yelena Leuchanka | 33 – 30 April 1983 | 1.95 m (6 ft 5 in) | Yakindogu | (Turkey) |
| G | 12 | Lindsey Harding | 31 – 26 October 1984 | 1.73 m (5 ft 8 in) | New York Liberty | (United States) |
| F | 13 | Tatyana Troina | 34 – 30 June 1981 | 1.88 m (6 ft 2 in) | Basket Gdynia | (Poland) |
| F | 14 | Nataliya Trafimava | 36 – 16 June 1979 | 1.84 m (6 ft 0 in) | BK Gorizont Minsk | (Belarus) |
| SG | 19 | Natallia Anufryienka | 31 – 11 June 1985 | 1.75 m (5 ft 9 in) | BK Gorizont Minsk | (Belarus) |
| SG | 20 | Kseniya Malashka | 16 – 12 January 2000 | 1.83 m (6 ft 0 in) | RGUOR Minsk | (Belarus) |
| SG | 41 | Yuliya Rytsikava | 29 – 8 September 1986 | 1.80 m (5 ft 11 in) | BK Gorizont Minsk | (Belarus) |

Head coach

- Anatoli Buyalski

Assistant coach(es)

- Mikalai Buzliakou

Legend

- Club – describes last played
  club before the tournament
- Age – describes age
  on 13 June 2016

Source
fiba.com

=== Nigeria ===
Nigeria women's national basketball team - 2016 Olympic Qualifying Tournament roster
Players
Coaches

| Pos. | No. | Name | Age – Date of birth | Height | Club |
|---|---|---|---|---|---|---|
| G | 4 | Helen Ogunjimi | 31 – 26 October 1984 | 1.70 m (5 ft 7 in) | Ferroviario Maputo | (Mozambique) |
| G | 5 | Upe Atosu | 23 – 21 April 1993 | 1.65 m (5 ft 5 in) | First Bank Basketball Club | (Nigeria) |
| G | 6 | Promise Amukamara | 22 – 22 June 1993 | 1.73 m (5 ft 8 in) | CREFF Madrid | (Spain) |
| G | 7 | Sarah Ogoke | 25 – 25 June 1990 | 1.77 m (5 ft 10 in) | Celta de Vigo Baloncesto | (Spain) |
| G | 8 | Ezinne Kalu | 23 – 26 June 1992 | 1.73 m (5 ft 8 in) | Desportivo Torres Novas | (Portugal) |
| G | 9 | Joyce Ekworomadu | 19 – 6 August 1996 | 1.77 m (5 ft 10 in) | Harlem Globetrotters | (United States) |
| SF | 10 | Uju Ugoka | 23 – 24 May 1993 | 1.85 m (6 ft 1 in) | Lavezzini Parma | (Italy) |
| SF | 11 | Adaora Elonu | 26 – 28 April 1990 | 1.85 m (6 ft 1 in) | CB Conquero | (Spain) |
| F | 12 | Ndidi Madu | 27 – 17 March 1989 | 1.88 m (6 ft 2 in) | ŽKK Budućnost Podgorica | (Montenegro) |
| C | 13 | Elem Ibiam | 23 – 7 May 1993 | 1.95 m (6 ft 5 in) | Kangoroes | (Belgium) |
| C | 14 | Chioma Udeaja | 31 – 29 June 1984 | 1.90 m (6 ft 3 in) | First Bank Basketball Club | (Nigeria) |
| C | 15 | Olayinka Sanni | 29 – 21 August 1986 | 1.88 m (6 ft 2 in) | Maccabi Ashdod | (Israel) |

Head coach

- Scott Nnaji

Assistant coach(es)

- Adewunmi Aderemi
- Mauro Procaccini

Legend

- Club – describes last played
  club before the tournament
- Age – describes age
  on 13 June 2016

Source
fiba.com

=== South Korea ===
South Korea women's national basketball team - 2016 Olympic Qualifying Tournament roster
Players
Coaches

| Pos. | No. | Name | Age – Date of birth | Height | Club |
|---|---|---|---|---|---|---|
| C | 1 | Ji Hee Yang | 31 – 25 October 1984 | 1.85 m (6 ft 1 in) | Woori Bank Hansae | (South Korea) |
| F | 2 | Leeseul Kang | 22 – 5 April 1994 | 1.80 m (5 ft 11 in) | KEB Hana Bank | (South Korea) |
| G | 3 | Seungah Lee | 24 – 25 May 1992 | 1.75 m (5 ft 9 in) | Woori Bank Hansae | (South Korea) |
| G | 5 | Ah Ra Go | 27 – 23 September 1988 | 1.78 m (5 ft 10 in) | Samsung Life Blue Minx | (South Korea) |
| G | 6 | Eun Hye Lee | 26 – 7 July 1989 | 1.68 m (5 ft 6 in) | Woori Bank Hansae | (South Korea) |
| F | 7 | Ajeong Kang | 26 – 25 July 1989 | 1.80 m (5 ft 11 in) | KB Stars | (South Korea) |
| C | 9 | Joo-Yeong Kwak | 31 – 21 August 1984 | 1.83 m (6 ft 0 in) | Shinhan Bank S-Birds | (South Korea) |
| C | 10 | Hyeyoon Bae | 27 – 10 June 1989 | 1.83 m (6 ft 0 in) | Woori Bank Hansae | (South Korea) |
| F | 11 | Yung Hui Lim | 36 – 29 May 1980 | 1.78 m (5 ft 10 in) | Woori Bank Hansae | (South Korea) |
| G | 12 | Hyejin Park | 25 – 22 July 1990 | 1.78 m (5 ft 10 in) | Woori Bank Hansae | (South Korea) |
| F | 13 | Danbi Kim | 26 – 27 February 1990 | 1.80 m (5 ft 11 in) | Shinhan Bank S-Birds | (South Korea) |
| C | 17 | Park Ji-su | 17 – 6 December 1998 | 1.95 m (6 ft 5 in) | Bundang High School | (South Korea) |

Head coach

- Sungwoo We

Assistant coach(es)

- Jooweon Chun

Legend

- Club – describes last played
  club before the tournament
- Age – describes age
  on 13 June 2016

Source
fiba.com

== Group D ==
=== China ===
China women's national basketball team - 2016 Olympic Qualifying Tournament roster
Players
Coaches

| Pos. | No. | Name | Age – Date of birth | Height | Club | Ctr. |
|---|---|---|---|---|---|---|
| G | 4 | Zhao Zhifang | 21 – 21 August 1994 | 1.68 m (5 ft 6 in) | Tianjin University | (China) |
| G | 5 | Chen Xiaojia | 28 – 2 April 1988 | 1.80 m (5 ft 11 in) | Jiangsu Phoenix | (China) |
| G | 6 | Li Shanshan | 29 – 3 March 1987 | 1.77 m (5 ft 10 in) | Jiangsu Phoenix | (China) |
| F | 7 | Shao Ting | 26 – 10 December 1989 | 1.84 m (6 ft 0 in) | Beijing Great Wall | (China) |
| G | 8 | Wu Di | 22 – 27 October 1993 | 1.82 m (6 ft 0 in) | Tianjin University | (China) |
| F | 9 | Sun Mengxin | 23 – 8 April 1993 | 1.90 m (6 ft 3 in) | Bayi Kylin | (China) |
| F | 10 | Lu Wen | 26 – 26 February 1990 | 1.90 m (6 ft 3 in) | Bayi Kylin | (China) |
| PF | 11 | Huang Sijing | 20 – 8 January 1996 | 1.90 m (6 ft 3 in) | Guangdong Dolphins | (China) |
| PF | 12 | Gao Song | 24 – 16 April 1992 | 1.90 m (6 ft 3 in) | Beijing Great Wall | (China) |
| C | 13 | Sun Mengran | 23 – 16 July 1992 | 1.95 m (6 ft 5 in) | Bayi Kylin | (China) |
| C | 14 | Huang Hongpin | 27 – 23 April 1989 | 1.95 m (6 ft 5 in) | Shanxi Flame | (China) |
| C | 15 | Chen Nan | 33 – 8 January 1983 | 1.95 m (6 ft 5 in) | Bayi Kylin | (China) |

Head coach

- (Australia) Tom Maher

Assistant coach(es)

- (Australia) Michele Timms
- (China) Xu Limin

Team manager

- (China) Xue Yunfei

Legend

- Club – describes last
  club before the tournament
- Age – describes age
  on 13 June 2016

Source
fiba.com

=== Spain ===
Spain women's national basketball team - 2016 Olympic Qualifying Tournament roster
Players
Coaches

| Pos. | No. | Name | Age – Date of birth | Height | Club |
|---|---|---|---|---|---|---|
| G | 2 | Leticia Romero | 21 – 28 May 1995 | 1.74 m (5 ft 9 in) | Florida State Seminoles | (United States) |
| F | 4 | Laura Nicholls | 27 – 26 February 1989 | 1.90 m (6 ft 3 in) | WBC Wisła Kraków | (Poland) |
| G | 6 | Sílvia Domínguez | 29 – 31 January 1987 | 1.67 m (5 ft 6 in) | CB Avenida | (Spain) |
| F | 7 | Alba Torrens | 26 – 30 August 1989 | 1.91 m (6 ft 3 in) | UMMC Ekaterinburg | (Russia) |
| G | 9 | Laia Palau (C) | 36 – 10 September 1979 | 1.81 m (5 ft 11 in) | ZVVZ USK Praha | (Czech Republic) |
| G | 10 | Marta Xargay | 25 – 20 December 1990 | 1.80 m (5 ft 11 in) | ZVVZ USK Praha | (Czech Republic) |
| F | 11 | Leonor Rodríguez | 24 – 21 October 1991 | 1.80 m (5 ft 11 in) | CB Avenida | (Spain) |
| C | 13 | Lucila Pascua | 33 – 21 March 1983 | 1.96 m (6 ft 5 in) | Mann-Filter | (Spain) |
| G | 15 | Anna Cruz | 29 – 27 October 1986 | 1.79 m (5 ft 10 in) | Nadezhda Orenburg | (Russia) |
| F | 19 | Laura Quevedo | 20 – 15 April 1996 | 1.82 m (6 ft 0 in) | Club Universitario de Ferrol | (Spain) |
| F | 24 | Laura Gil | 24 – 24 April 1992 | 1.91 m (6 ft 3 in) | Cadí La Seu | (Spain) |
| C | 45 | Astou Ndour | 21 – 22 September 1994 | 1.95 m (6 ft 5 in) | CB Avenida | (Russia) |

Head coach

- Lucas Mondelo

Assistant coach(es)

- Víctor Lapeña
- Isabel Sánchez

Legend

- Club – describes last played
  club before the tournament
- Age – describes age
  on 13 June 2016

Source
fiba.com

=== Venezuela ===
Venezuela women's national basketball team - 2016 Olympic Qualifying Tournament roster
Players
Coaches

| Pos. | No. | Name | Age – Date of birth | Height | Club |
|---|---|---|---|---|---|---|
| C | 4 | Mayerling Landaeta | 23 – 25 January 1993 | 1.82 m (6 ft 0 in) | Deportivo Anzoátegui | (Venezuela) |
| SG | 5 | Roselis Silva | 24 – 1 August 1991 | 1.65 m (5 ft 5 in) | Deportivo Anzoátegui | (Venezuela) |
| PF | 6 | Yosimar Corrales | 26 – 5 February 1990 | 1.80 m (5 ft 11 in) | Uruguay Unemi | (Ecuador) |
| C | 7 | Ana García | 33 – 24 November 1982 | 1.92 m (6 ft 4 in) | Deportivo Anzoátegui | (Venezuela) |
| F | 8 | Ivaney Marquez | 33 – 17 March 1983 | 1.79 m (5 ft 10 in) | Uruguay Unemi | (Ecuador) |
| F | 9 | Daniela Wallen | 21 – 4 April 1995 | 1.77 m (5 ft 10 in) | Deportivo Anzoátegui | (Venezuela) |
| SG | 10 | Luisana Ortega | 26 – 25 September 1989 | 1.73 m (5 ft 8 in) | | (Venezuela) |
| PG | 11 | Mariana Duran | 23 – 12 May 1993 | 1.68 m (5 ft 6 in) | Deportivo Anzoátegui | (Venezuela) |
| C | 13 | Marielka Garate | 21 – 7 February 1995 | 1.83 m (6 ft 0 in) | Deportivo Anzoátegui | (Venezuela) |
| PG | 14 | Waleska Perez | 22 – 17 February 1994 | 1.79 m (5 ft 10 in) | Deportivo Anzoátegui | (Venezuela) |
| PF | 15 | Sharol Renault | 29 – 27 September 1986 | 1.70 m (5 ft 7 in) | | (Venezuela) |
| SG | 16 | Dianora Rivas | 25 – 26 November 1990 | 1.64 m (5 ft 5 in) | | (Venezuela) |

Head coach

- Oscar Silva

Assistant coach(es)

- Brickman Morales
- David Sequera

Legend

- Club – describes last played
  club before the tournament
- Age – describes age
  on 13 June 2016

Source
fiba.com
