= Basketball at the 2016 Summer Olympics – Women's tournament =

Tournament details
- Host country: Brazil
- Dates: 6–20 August 2016
- Teams: 12 (from 6 federations)
- Venue(s): Carioca Arena 1 Youth Arena

Final positions
- Champions: United States (8th title)

Tournament statistics
- Games played: 38
- Top scorer: (Australia) Cambage (23.5)
- Top rebounds: (Brazil) Dos Santos (12.4)
- Top assists: (Japan) Yoshida (8.7)
- PPG (Team): United States (102.1)
- RPG (Team): United States (45.5)
- APG (Team): United States (27.9)

The 2016 Summer Olympics women's basketball tournament in Rio de Janeiro, began on 6 August and ended on 20 August 2016.

The United States won their eighth total and sixth consecutive gold medal by defeating Spain 101–72 in the final. Serbia captured their first bronze medal after beating France 70–63.

The medals were presented by Patrick Baumann of Switzerland, Sir Philip Craven of Great Britain, Angela Ruggiero of the United States of America, and members of the International Olympic Committee, while the gifts were presented by Horacio Muratore, Lena Wallin Kantzy, José Luis Sáez, and the President and Central Board Members of FIBA.

== Competition schedule ==
G	Group stage	¼	Quarter-finals	½	Semi-finals	B	Bronze medal match	F	Final

Sat 6	Sun 7	Mon 8	Tue 9	Wed 10	Thu 11	Fri 12	Sat 13	Sun 14	Mon 15	Tue 16	Wed 17	Thu 18	Fri 19	Sat 20	
G	G	G	G	G	G	G	G	G		¼		½		B	F

== Qualification ==
Means of qualification	Date	Venue	Berths	Qualified
2014 FIBA World Championship	27 September – 5 October 2014	Turkey	1	United States
EuroBasket Women 2015	11–28 June 2015	Various	1	Serbia
Host nation	9 August 2015	(Japan) Tokyo	1	Brazil
2015 FIBA Americas Championship	9–16 August 2015	(Canada) Edmonton	1	Canada
2015 FIBA Oceania Championship	15–17 August 2015	Various	1	Australia
2015 FIBA Asia Championship	29 August – 5 September 2015	(China) Wuhan	1	Japan
AfroBasket Women 2015	24 September – 3 October 2015	(Cameroon) Yaoundé	1	Senegal
2016 FIBA World Olympic Qualifying Tournament	13–19 June 2016	(France) Nantes	5	Belarus
2016 FIBA World Olympic Qualifying Tournament	13–19 June 2016	(France) Nantes	5	China
2016 FIBA World Olympic Qualifying Tournament	13–19 June 2016	(France) Nantes	5	France
2016 FIBA World Olympic Qualifying Tournament	13–19 June 2016	(France) Nantes	5	Spain
2016 FIBA World Olympic Qualifying Tournament	13–19 June 2016	(France) Nantes	5	Turkey
Total			12	

== Squads ==
Each NOC was limited to one team per tournament. Each team had a roster of twelve players, one of which could be a naturalized player.

== Referees ==
The following referees were selected for the tournament.

- (Angola) Carlos Júlio
- (Argentina) Leandro Lezcano
- (Australia) Scott Beker
- (Australia) Vaughan Mayberry
- (Brazil) Guilherme Locatelli
- (Brazil) Cristiano Maranho
- (Canada) Karen Lasuik
- (Canada) Stephen Seibel
- (China) Duan Zhu
- (Croatia) Sreten Radović
- (Dominican Republic) Natalia Cuello
- (France) Eddie Viator
- (Germany) Robert Lottermoser
- (Germany) Anne Panther
- (Greece) Christos Christodoulou
- (Ivory Coast) Nadege Zouzou
- (South Korea) Hwang In-tae
- (Latvia) Oļegs Latiševs
- (Mexico) José Reyes
- (Morocco) Chahinaz Boussetta
- (Oman) Ahmed Al-Bulushi
- (Philippines) Ferdinand Pascual
- (Poland) Piotr Pastusiak
- (Puerto Rico) Roberto Vázquez
- (Serbia) Ilija Belošević
- (Slovenia) Damir Javor
- (Spain) Juan Carlos García
- (Spain) Carlos Peruga
- (Ukraine) Borys Ryzhyk
- (United States) Steven Anderson

== Draw ==
The draw was held at the FIBA Headquarters, also known as the "House of Basketball" in Mies, Switzerland on 11 March 2016. As the five winners of the 2016 FIBA World Olympic Qualifying Tournament for Women (OQT) were yet to be known, they were assigned placeholders as "OQT 1", "OQT 2", "OQT 3", "OQT 4" and "OQT 5". These were the pot assignments:

Pot 1	Pot 2	Pot 3	Pot 4	Pot 5	Pot 6
United States; Australia	Canada; Brazil	Senegal; Japan	Serbia; OQT 1	OQT 2 OQT 3	OQT 4 OQT 5

Group A was assigned with OQT 1, OQT 3 and OQT 5, while Group B had OQT 2 and OQT 4.

== Group stage ==
All times are local (UTC−3).

=== Group A ===
Pos	Team	Pld	W	L	PF	PA	PD	Pts	Qualification
1	Australia	5	5	0	400	345	+55	10	Quarter-finals
2	France	5	3	2	344	343	+1	8 (Note: Head-to-head record: France 3 pts, +8 PD; Turkey 3 pts, −2 PD; Japan 3 pts, −6 PD)	Quarter-finals
3	Turkey	5	3	2	324	325	−1	8	Quarter-finals
4	Japan	5	3	2	386	378	+8	8	Quarter-finals
5	Belarus	5	1	4	347	361	−14	6	
6	Brazil (H)	5	0	5	335	384	−49	5	

Source: FIBA
Rules for classification: 1) points; 2) head-to-head points; 3) head-to-head points difference; 4) head-to-head number of points scored.
(H) Hosts
Notes:

6 August 2016
12:00

Boxscore

Turkey	39–55	France
Scoring by quarter: 16–8, 3–14, 16–19, 4–14
Pts: Yılmaz 16; Rebs: Yılmaz 6 Asts: Vardarlı 5		Pts: Michel, Miyem 14; Rebs: Yacoubou 11; Asts: Epoupa 5

Youth Arena, Rio de Janeiro
Attendance: 2,042
Referees: Guilherme Locatelli (BRA), Scott Beker (AUS), Natalia Cuello (DOM)

6 August 2016
17:30

Boxscore

Brazil	66–84	Australia
Scoring by quarter: 24–14, 15–21, 14–22, 13–27
Pts: Castro Marques 25; Rebs: dos Santos 13; Asts: Pinto 7		Pts: Cambage 20; Rebs: Cambage 14; Asts: Mitchell 6

Youth Arena, Rio de Janeiro
Attendance: 2,368
Referees: Ilija Belošević (SRB), Karen Lasuik (CAN), Piotr Pastusiak (POL)

6 August 2016
19:45

Boxscore

Belarus	73–77	Japan
Scoring by quarter: 21–26, 19–15, 20–19, 13–17
Pts: Leuchanka 15; Rebs: Verameyenka 10; Asts: Harding 5		Pts: Kurihara 20; Rebs: Yoshida 9 Asts: Yoshida 8

Youth Arena, Rio de Janeiro
Attendance: 2,586
Referees: Damir Javor (SLO), Chahinaz Boussetta (MAR), Hwang In-tae (KOR)

7 August 2016
17:30

Boxscore

Australia	61–56	Turkey
Scoring by quarter: 12–15, 14–14, 17–12, 18–15
Pts: Cambage 22; Rebs: Cambage 11; Asts: three players 3		Pts: Sanders 25; Rebs: Sanders 7 Asts: Vardarlı 7

Youth Arena, Rio de Janeiro
Attendance: 1,853
Referees: Anne Panther (GER), Leandro Lezcano (ARG), Carlos Peruga (ESP)

7 August 2016
19:45

Boxscore

France	73–72	Belarus
Scoring by quarter: 14–22, 20–20, 18–11, 21–19
Pts: Epoupa 16; Rebs: Michel 8 Asts: Epoupa 5		Pts: Likhtarovich 16; Rebs: Leuchanka 13; Asts: Harding 8

Youth Arena, Rio de Janeiro
Attendance: 2,075
Referees: Ferdinand Pascual (PHI), Duan Zhu (CHN), Vaughan Mayberry (AUS)

8 August 2016
17:30

Boxscore

Japan	82–66	Brazil
Scoring by quarter: 19–20, 28–13, 26–19, 9–14
Pts: Tokashiki 23; Rebs: Tokashiki 9 Asts: Yoshida 11		Pts: Castro Marques 20; Rebs: Dos Santos 16; Asts: Pinto 6

Youth Arena, Rio de Janeiro
Attendance: 2,624
Referees: José Reyes (MEX), Carlos Peruga (ESP), Nadege Zouzou (CIV)

9 August 2016
12:15

Boxscore

Australia	89–71	France
Scoring by quarter: 21–19, 25–10, 23–21, 20–21
Pts: Taylor 31; Rebs: Cambage 7 Asts: Taylor 9		Pts: Epoupa 15; Rebs: Epoupa 7 Asts: Bouderra 4

Youth Arena, Rio de Janeiro
Attendance: 1,481
Referees: Borys Ryzhyk (UKR), Duan Zhu (CHN), Hwang In-tae (KOR)

9 August 2016
15:30

Boxscore

Brazil	63–65	Belarus
Scoring by quarter: 28–16, 12–19, 10–15, 13–15
Pts: Dantas 23; Rebs: Dos Santos 11; Asts: Pinto 4		Pts: Troina 18; Rebs: Leuchanka, Verameyenka 6 Asts: Harding 6

Youth Arena, Rio de Janeiro
Attendance: 2,075
Referees: Sreten Radović (CRO), Natalia Cuello (DOM), Leandro Lezcano (ARG)

9 August 2016
17:45

Boxscore

Turkey	76–62	Japan
Scoring by quarter: 24–9, 14–14, 19–16, 19–23
Pts: Sanders 36; Rebs: Çağlar 9 Asts: Alben, Çakır 5		Pts: Tokashiki 13; Rebs: Tokashiki 7 Asts: Yoshida 7

Youth Arena, Rio de Janeiro
Attendance: 2,624
Referees: Oļegs Latiševs (LAT), Ferdinand Pascual (PHI), Chanihaz Boussetta (MAR)

11 August 2016
12:15

Boxscore

Belarus	71–74	Turkey
Scoring by quarter: 19–13, 14–20, 21–24, 17–17
Pts: Harding 17; Rebs: Leuchanka 10; Asts: Verameyenka 7		Pts: Yılmaz 26; Rebs: Sanders 11; Asts: Vardarlı 7

Youth Arena, Rio de Janeiro
Attendance: 1,784
Referees: Carlos Peruga (ESP), Hwang In-tae (KOR), Carlos Júlio (ANG)

11 August 2016
15:30

Boxscore

France	74–64	Brazil
Scoring by quarter: 20–20, 15–9, 22–19, 17–16
Pts: Skrela 18; Rebs: Gruda 10; Asts: Époupa 7		Pts: Dantas 21; Rebs: Dos Santos 10; Asts: three players 5

Youth Arena, Rio de Janeiro
Attendance: 3,128
Referees: Juan Carlos García (ESP), Karen Lasuik (CAN), Ferdinand Pascual (PHI)

11 August 2016
17:45

Boxscore

Japan	86–92	Australia
Scoring by quarter: 24–23, 26–25, 21–11, 15–33
Pts: Tokashiki 23; Rebs: Kurihara, Tokashiki 7 Asts: Yoshida 11		Pts: Cambage 37; Rebs: Cambage 10; Asts: Mitchell, Taylor 7

Youth Arena, Rio de Janeiro
Attendance: 3,315
Referees: Anne Panther (GER), Leandro Lezcano (ARG), Ahmed Al-Bulushi (OMA)

13 August 2016
12:15

Boxscore

Australia	74–66	Belarus
Scoring by quarter: 22–25, 14–14, 16–20, 22–7
Pts: Cambage 17; Rebs: Cambage 9 Asts: Lavey 6		Pts: Harding 16; Rebs: Leuchanka 7 Asts: Likhtarovich, Leuchanka 4

Youth Arena, Rio de Janeiro
Attendance: 3,081
Referees: Karen Lasuik (CAN), Duan Zhu (CHN), Nadege Zouzou (CIV)

13 August 2016
15:30

Boxscore

Turkey	79–76 (2OT)	Brazil
Scoring by quarter: 8–15, 12–21, 21–11, 19–13, Overtime: 10–10, 9–6
Pts: Sanders 23; Rebs: Sanders 10; Asts: Alben 5		Pts: Castro 22; Rebs: Dos Santos 12; Asts: Castro 8

Youth Arena, Rio de Janeiro
Attendance: 3,075
Referees: Juan Carlos García (ESP), Hwang In-tae (KOR), Piotr Pastusiak (POL)

13 August 2016
17:45

Boxscore

Japan	79–71	France
Scoring by quarter: 17–19, 23–13, 23–22, 16–17
Pts: Yoshida 24; Rebs: Tokashiki 7 Asts: Yoshida 7		Pts: Epoupa, Yacoubou 14; Rebs: Gruda 9 Asts: Gruda 4

Youth Arena, Rio de Janeiro
Attendance: 3,351
Referees: Sreten Radović (CRO), Carlos Peruga (ESP), Carlos Júlio (ANG)

=== Group B ===
Pos	Team	Pld	W	L	PF	PA	PD	Pts	Qualification
1	United States	5	5	0	520	316	+204	10	Quarter-finals
2	Spain	5	4	1	387	333	+54	9	Quarter-finals
3	Canada	5	3	2	340	347	−7	8	Quarter-finals
4	Serbia	5	2	3	385	406	−21	7	Quarter-finals
5	China	5	1	4	371	428	−57	6	
6	Senegal	5	0	5	309	482	−173	5	

Source: FIBA
Rules for classification: 1) points; 2) head-to-head points; 3) head-to-head points difference; 4) head-to-head number of points scored.

6 August 2016
14:15

Boxscore

China	68–90	Canada
Scoring by quarter: 9–19, 17–18, 20–23, 22–30
Pts: Chen N. 13; Rebs: Sun Mengr. 5 Asts: Chen X., Sun Mengx. 3		Pts: Tatham 20; Rebs: Gaucher 10; Asts: Gaucher 7

Youth Arena, Rio de Janeiro
Attendance: 2,314
Referees: Juan Carlos García (ESP), Carlos Júlio (ANG), Anne Panther (GER)

7 August 2016
12:00

Boxscore

United States	121–56	Senegal
Scoring by quarter: 35–9, 29–12, 30–17, 27–18
Pts: three players 15; Rebs: Fowles, Griner 7 Asts: Bird 8		Pts: Dieng 10; Rebs: Diarra, Ay. Traoré 5 Asts: Dieng 4

Youth Arena, Rio de Janeiro
Attendance: 2,219
Referees: Cristiano Maranho (BRA), Ahmed Al-Bulushi (OMA), Nadege Zouzou (CIV)

7 August 2016
14:15

Boxscore

Serbia	59–65	Spain
Scoring by quarter: 18–19, 13–12, 13–15, 15–19
Pts: Milovanović 17; Rebs: Petrović 8 Asts: A. Dabović 4		Pts: Xargay 15; Rebs: Ndour 12; Asts: Palau, Torrens 5

Youth Arena, Rio de Janeiro
Attendance: 2,654
Referees: Roberto Vázquez (PUR), Natalia Cuello (DOM), Piotr Pastusiak (POL)

8 August 2016
12:00

Boxscore

Spain	63–103	United States
Scoring by quarter: 14–29, 23–25, 14–20, 12–29
Pts: Torrens 20; Rebs: Ndour 8 Asts: Domínguez 3		Pts: Taurasi 13; Rebs: Charles 6 Asts: Bird, Charles 5

Youth Arena, Rio de Janeiro
Attendance: 2,073
Referees: Christos Christodoulou (GRE), Sreten Radović (CRO), Ahmed Al-Bulushi (OMA)

8 August 2016
14:15

Boxscore

Canada	71–67	Serbia
Scoring by quarter: 21–21, 11–19, 13–17, 26–10
Pts: Nurse 25; Rebs: Raincock-Ekunwe 9 Asts: Langolis, Nurse 5		Pts: Milovanović 19; Rebs: Page 6 Asts: A. Dabović 5

Youth Arena, Rio de Janeiro
Attendance: 2,377
Referees: Robert Lottermoser (GER), Vaughan Mayberry (AUS), Hwang In-tae (KOR)

8 August 2016
19:45

Boxscore

Senegal	64–101	China
Scoring by quarter: 21–26, 17–21, 15–26, 11–28
Pts: As. Traoré 16; Rebs: Diarra 8 Asts: Dieng 4		Pts: Shao, Sun Mengr. 17; Rebs: Lu 7 Asts: Zhao 6

Youth Arena, Rio de Janeiro
Attendance: 2,907
Referees: Karen Lasuik (CAN), Carlos Júlio (ANG), Chahinaz Boussetta (MAR)

10 August 2016
12:15

Boxscore

China	68–89	Spain
Scoring by quarter: 18–14, 20–27, 21–23, 9–25
Pts: Shao 14; Rebs: Sun Mengr. 8 Asts: Chen 6		Pts: Torrens 32; Rebs: Nicholls 10; Asts: Palau 7

Youth Arena, Rio de Janeiro
Attendance: 1,230
Referees: Eddie Viator (FRA), Leandro Lezcano (ARG), Natalia Cuello (DOM)

10 August 2016
15:30

Boxscore

United States	110–84	Serbia
Scoring by quarter: 31–21, 25–13, 28–27, 26–23
Pts: Taurasi 25; Rebs: Charles 8 Asts: Taurasi 6		Pts: three players 15; Rebs: A. Dabović 5 Asts: A. Dabović, M. Dabović 4

Youth Arena, Rio de Janeiro
Attendance: 2,490
Referees: Piotr Pastusiak (POL), Scott Beker (AUS), Nadege Zouzou (CIV)

10 August 2016
17:45

Boxscore

Senegal	58–68	Canada
Scoring by quarter: 10–17, 14–16, 17–22, 17–13
Pts: Traore 24; Rebs: Diarra 9 Asts: Diémé 6		Pts: Nurse 14; Rebs: Tatham 10; Asts: Langolis 6

Youth Arena, Rio de Janeiro
Attendance: 2,640
Referees: Anne Panther (GER), Carlos Júlio (ANG), Ahmed Al-Bulushi (OMA)

12 August 2016
12:15

Boxscore

Serbia	80–72	China
Scoring by quarter: 24–14, 16–20, 26–9, 14–29
Pts: A. Dabović 23; Rebs: Page, Petrović 8 Asts: Petrović 6		Pts: Sun Mengr. 16; Rebs: Huang, Sun Mengr. 7 Asts: three players 3

Youth Arena, Rio de Janeiro
Attendance: 2,219
Referees: Christos Christodoulou (GRE), Natalia Cuello (DOM), Nadege Zouzou (CIV)

12 August 2016
15:30

Boxscore

Canada	51–81	United States
Scoring by quarter: 16–18, 6–18, 14–24, 15–21
Pts: Ayim 8 Rebs: Raincock-Ekunwe 8 Asts: Langlois, Tatham 3		Pts: Moore, Taurasi 12; Rebs: Moore 8 Asts: Bird 9

Youth Arena, Rio de Janeiro
Attendance: 3,138
Referees: Eddie Viator (FRA), Vaughan Mayberry (AUS), Ahmed Al-Bulushi (OMA)

12 August 2016
17:45

Boxscore

Spain	97–43	Senegal
Scoring by quarter: 26–11, 20–8, 25–13, 26–11
Pts: Torrens 14; Rebs: Nicholls 7 Asts: four players 5		Pts: Sy 16; Rebs: Diarra 6 Asts: three players 2

Youth Arena, Rio de Janeiro
Attendance: 3,329
Referees: Scott Beker (AUS), Leandro Lezcano (ARG), Chahinaz Boussetta (MAR)

14 August 2016
12:15

Boxscore

China	62–105	United States
Scoring by quarter: 9–32, 17–28, 14–18, 22–27
Pts: Sun Mengr. 16; Rebs: Chen X. 6 Asts: Chen X. 6		Pts: Charles, Griner 18; Rebs: Griner 13; Asts: Moore 8

Youth Arena, Rio de Janeiro
Attendance: 2,957
Referees: Ferdinand Pascual (PHI), Robert Lottermoser (GER), Chahinaz Boussetta (MAR)

14 August 2016
15:30

Boxscore

Senegal	88–95	Serbia
Scoring by quarter: 15–27, 28–28, 23–21, 22–19
Pts: As. Traoré 30; Rebs: As. Traoré 8 Asts: Diouf 8		Pts: Petrović 20; Rebs: Page 8 Asts: A. Dabović 8

Youth Arena, Rio de Janeiro
Attendance: 3,113
Referees: Eddie Viator (FRA), Piotr Pastusiak (POL), Hwang In-tae (KOR)

14 August 2016
17:45

Boxscore

Spain	73–60	Canada
Scoring by quarter: 17–16, 16–13, 16–18, 24–13
Pts: Torrens 20; Rebs: Nicholls 12; Asts: Palau 6		Pts: Fields 13; Rebs: Achonwa, Raincock-Ekunwe 7 Asts: three players 2

Youth Arena, Rio de Janeiro
Attendance: 3,026
Referees: Cristiano Maranho (BRA), Vaughan Mayberry (AUS), Natalia Cuello (DOM)

== Knockout stage ==
=== Bracket ===
Quarter-finals
16 August
France	68
Canada	63
16 August
United States	110
Japan	64
16 August
Spain	64
Turkey	62
16 August
Australia	71
Serbia	73

Semi-finals
18 August
France	67
United States	86
18 August
Spain	68
Serbia	54

Gold medal
20 August
United States	101
Spain	72
Bronze medal
20 August
France	63
Serbia	70

=== Quarterfinals ===
16 August 2016
11:00

Boxscore

Australia	71–73	Serbia
Scoring by quarter: 20–20, 17–15, 15–16, 19–22
Pts: Cambage 29; Rebs: Cambage 11; Asts: Taylor 9		Pts: A. Dabović 24; Rebs: four players 4 Asts: Petrović 5

Carioca Arena 1, Rio de Janeiro
Attendance: 5,630
Referees: Eddie Viator (FRA), Karen Lasuik (CAN), Natalia Cuello (DOM)

16 August 2016
14:30

Boxscore

Spain	64–62	Turkey
Scoring by quarter: 12–17, 17–8, 13–22, 22–15
Pts: Cruz 14; Rebs: Torrens 11; Asts: Cruz 6		Pts: Sanders 22; Rebs: Sanders 10; Asts: Alben 6

Carioca Arena 1, Rio de Janeiro
Attendance: 6,565
Referees: Cristiano Maranho (BRA), Anne Panther (GER), Leandro Lezcano (ARG)

16 August 2016
18:45

Boxscore

United States	110–64	Japan
Scoring by quarter: 30–23, 26–23, 25–13, 29–5
Pts: Moore, Taurasi 19; Rebs: Griner 7 Asts: Charles 5		Pts: Tokashiki 14; Rebs: four players 3 Asts: Yoshida 8

Carioca Arena 1, Rio de Janeiro
Attendance: 7,471
Referees: Carlos Peruga (ESP), Duan Zhu (CHN), Carlos Júlio (ANG)

16 August 2016
22:15

Boxscore

France	68–63	Canada
Scoring by quarter: 16–25, 16–12, 18–13, 18–13
Pts: Gruda 14; Rebs: Gruda 10; Asts: Époupa 6		Pts: Gaucher 15; Rebs: three players 5 Asts: Tatham 4

Carioca Arena 1, Rio de Janeiro
Attendance: 7,200
Referees: Sreten Radović (CRO), Vaughan Mayberry (AUS), Hwang In-tae (KOR)

=== Semifinals ===
18 August 2016
15:00

Boxscore

Spain	68–54	Serbia
Scoring by quarter: 20–9, 13–19, 20–10, 15–16
Pts: Ndour, Torrens 14; Rebs: Nicholls 12; Asts: Palau 7		Pts: Čađo, Petrović 12; Rebs: Page, Petrović 7 Asts: Butulija 3

Carioca Arena 1, Rio de Janeiro
Attendance: 8,818
Referees: Damir Javor (SLO), Scott Beker (AUS), Anne Panther (GER)

18 August 2016
19:00

Boxscore

France	67–86	United States
Scoring by quarter: 15–19, 21–21, 8–25, 23–21
Pts: Yacoubou 14; Rebs: Gruda 6 Asts: Michel 3		Pts: Taurasi 18; Rebs: Fowles 9 Asts: Taurasi 4

Carioca Arena 1, Rio de Janeiro
Attendance: 8,431
Referees: Ferdinand Pascual (PHI), Karen Lasuik (CAN), Duan Zhu (CHN)

=== Bronze medal game ===
20 August 2016
11:30

Boxscore

France	63–70	Serbia (bronze)
Scoring by quarter: 10–18, 17–9, 15–28, 21–15
Pts: Miyem 18; Rebs: Yacoubou 10; Asts: Époupa 4		Pts: Milovanović 18; Rebs: Page 8 Asts: A. Dabović 5

Carioca Arena 1, Rio de Janeiro
Attendance: 9,039
Referees: Carlos Peruga (ESP), Anne Panther (GER), Natalia Cuello (DOM)

=== Gold medal game ===
20 August 2016
15:30

Boxscore

(gold) United States	101–72	Spain (silver)
Scoring by quarter: 21–17, 28–15, 32–17, 20–23
Pts: Whalen, Taurasi 17; Rebs: Charles, Griner 7 Asts: Whalen 6		Pts: Torrens 18; Rebs: Torrens, Ndour 5 Asts: Torrens, Cruz 4

Carioca Arena 1, Rio de Janeiro
Attendance: 9,586
Referees: Eddie Viator (FRA), Piotr Pastusiak (POL), Hwang In-tae (KOR)

== Awards ==
2016 Women's Olympic Basketball Champions

United States
Eighth title

== Statistical leaders ==
=== Individual statistical leaders ===
Points
Name	PPG
Elizabeth Cambage (AUS)	23.5
LaToya Sanders (TUR)	22.0
Ramu Tokashiki (JPN)	17.0
Damiris Dantas (BRA)	16.8
Alba Torrens (ESP)	16.4

Rebounds
Name	RPG
Clarissa dos Santos (BRA)	12.4
Elizabeth Cambage (AUS)	10.3
Yelena Leuchanka (BLR)	9.0
Astou Ndour (ESP)	8.3
LaToya Sanders (TUR)	8.2

Assists
Name	APG
Asami Yoshida (JPN)	8.7
Penny Taylor (AUS)	7.7
Lindsey Harding (BLR)	5.0
Adriana Moisés Pinto (BRA)	5.0
Laia Palau (ESP)	4.6

Blocks
Name	BPG
Astou Ndour (ESP)	2.1
Danielle Page (SRB)	1.6
LaToya Sanders (TUR)	1.5
Anastasiya Verameyenka (BLR)	1.4
Brittney Griner (USA)	1.4

Steals
Name	SPG
Olivia Epoupa (FRA)	2.9
Işıl Alben (TUR)	2.5
Asami Yoshida (JPN)	2.5
LaToya Sanders (TUR)	2.3
Damiris Dantas (BRA)	2.2
Astou Traoré (SEN)	2.2

=== Individual game highs ===
Statistic	Name	Total
Points	Elizabeth Cambage (AUS)	37
Rebounds	Clarissa dos Santos (BRA)	16
Assists	Asami Yoshida (JPN)	11
Blocks	Danielle Page (SRB); Astou Ndour (ESP); LaToya Sanders (TUR)	4
Steals	Işıl Alben (TUR)	8
Three pointers	Mika Kurihara (JPN); Diana Taurasi (USA)	6
Field Goal %	Brittney Griner (USA)	81.8%
3 point %	17 players tied	100%
Free throw %	32 players tied	100%

== Final ranking ==
Rankings are determined by:

- 1st–4th
  - Results of gold and bronze medal games.
- 5th–8th:
  - Win–loss record in the preliminary round group
  - Standings in the preliminary round group (i.e. Group A's #3 is ranked higher than Group B's #4.)
- 9th–10th and 11th–12th:
  - 5th placers in the preliminary round groups are classified 9th–10th; 6th placers classified *11th–12th
  - Win–loss record in the preliminary round group

Rank	Team	Pld	W	L	PF	PA	PD	Standing	New rank
Gold medal game participants
1st place, gold medalist(s)	United States	8	8	0	817	519	+298		1
2nd place, silver medalist(s)	Spain	8	6	2	591	550	+41		2 (▲1)
Bronze medal game participants
3rd place, bronze medalist(s)	Serbia	8	4	4	582	608	–26		9 (▲5)
4	France	8	4	4	542	562	–20		3 (▲1)
Eliminated at the quarterfinals
5	Australia	6	5	1	471	418	+53		4 (▼2)
6	Turkey	6	3	3	386	389	–3	A–3rd	7 (▲3)
7	Canada	6	3	3	403	415	–12	B–3rd	6 (▲3)
8	Japan	6	3	3	450	488	–38	C–4th	13 (▲3)
Preliminary round 5th placers
9	Belarus	5	1	4	347	361	–14		12 (▼2)
10	China	5	1	4	371	428	–57		10 (▼2)
Preliminary round 6th placers
11	Brazil	5	0	5	335	384	–49		8 (▲1)
12	Senegal	5	0	5	309	482	−173		17 (▲7)
