= 2016 United States women's Olympic basketball team =

- Head coach: Geno Auriemma
- Scoring leader: Diana Taurasi 15.6
- Rebounding leader: Brittney Griner 5.9
- Assists leader: Sue Bird 4.4
- Biggest win: 65 vs. Senegal
- Biggest defeat: none

The 2016 United States women's Olympic basketball team competed in the Games of the XXXI Olympiad which were held in Rio de Janeiro, Brazil. The U.S. women's Olympic team won their eighth gold medal, and sixth consecutive, at the event. The United States defeated Spain in the gold medal final en route to their eighth victory at the event. It was also coach Geno Auriemma's second gold medal win at the Olympics as head coach; he also coached the 2012 women's Olympic team.

== Roster ==
United States women's national basketball team – 2016 Summer Olympics roster
Players
Coaches

Pos.	No.	Name	Age – Date of birth	Height	Club	Ctr.
G	4	Lindsay Whalen	34 – May 9, 1982	5 ft 9 in (1.75 m)	Minnesota Lynx	(United States)
F	5	Seimone Augustus	32 – April 30, 1984	6 ft 0 in (1.83 m)	Minnesota Lynx	(United States)
G	6	Sue Bird	35 – October 16, 1980	5 ft 9 in (1.75 m)	Seattle Storm	(United States)
F	7	Maya Moore	27 – June 11, 1989	6 ft 0 in (1.83 m)	Minnesota Lynx	(United States)
F	8	Angel McCoughtry	29 – September 10, 1986	6 ft 1 in (1.85 m)	Atlanta Dream	(United States)
F/C	9	Breanna Stewart	21 – August 27, 1994	6 ft 4 in (1.93 m)	Seattle Storm	(United States)
F	10	Tamika Catchings	37 – July 21, 1979	6 ft 1 in (1.85 m)	Indiana Fever	(United States)
G/F	11	Elena Delle Donne	26 – September 5, 1989	6 ft 5 in (1.96 m)	Chicago Sky	(United States)
G	12	Diana Taurasi	34 – June 11, 1982	6 ft 0 in (1.83 m)	Phoenix Mercury	(United States)
C	13	Sylvia Fowles	30 – October 6, 1985	6 ft 6 in (1.98 m)	Minnesota Lynx	(United States)
C	14	Tina Charles	27 – December 5, 1988	6 ft 4 in (1.93 m)	New York Liberty	(United States)
C	15	Brittney Griner	25 – October 18, 1990	6 ft 8 in (2.03 m)	Phoenix Mercury	(United States)

Head coach

- (United States) Geno Auriemma

Assistant coach(es)

- (United States) Doug Bruno
- (United States) Dawn Staley
- (United States) Cheryl Reeve

Legend

- Club – describes last
  club before the tournament
- Age – describes age
  on August 6, 2016

== Results ==
=== Group stage ===
7 August 2016
12:00

Report

United States	121–56	Senegal
Scoring by quarter: 35–9, 29–12, 30–17, 27–18
Pts: three players 15; Rebs: Fowles, Griner 7 Asts: Bird 8		Pts: Dieng 10; Rebs: Diarra, Ay. Traoré 5 Asts: Dieng 4

Youth Arena, Rio de Janeiro
Attendance: 2,219
Referees: Cristiano Maranho (BRA), Ahmed Al-Bulushi (OMA), Nadege Zouzou (CIV)

8 August 2016
12:00

Report

Spain	63–103	United States
Scoring by quarter: 14–29, 23–25, 14–20, 12–29
Pts: Torrens 20; Rebs: Ndour 8 Asts: Domínguez 3		Pts: Taurasi 13; Rebs: Charles 6 Asts: Bird, Charles 5

Youth Arena, Rio de Janeiro
Attendance: 2,073
Referees: Christos Christodoulou (GRE), Sreten Radović (CRO), Ahmed Al-Bulushi (OMA)

10 August 2016
15:30

Report

United States	110–84	Serbia
Scoring by quarter: 31–21, 25–13, 28–27, 26–23
Pts: Taurasi 25; Rebs: Charles 8 Asts: Taurasi 6		Pts: three players 15; Rebs: A. Dabović 5 Asts: A. Dabović, M. Dabović 4

Youth Arena, Rio de Janeiro
Attendance: 2,490
Referees: Piotr Pastusiak (POL), Scott Beker (AUS), Nadege Zouzou (CIV)

12 August 2016
15:30

Report

Canada	51–81	United States
Scoring by quarter: 16–18, 6–18, 14–24, 15–21
Pts: Ayim 8 Rebs: Raincock-Ekunwe 8 Asts: Langlois, Tatham 3		Pts: Moore, Taurasi 12; Rebs: Moore 8 Asts: Bird 9

Youth Arena, Rio de Janeiro
Attendance: 3,138
Referees: Eddie Viator (FRA), Vaughan Mayberry (AUS), Ahmed Al-Bulushi (OMA)

14 August 2016
12:15

Report

China	62–105	United States
Scoring by quarter: 9–32, 17–28, 14–18, 22–27
Pts: Sun Mengr. 16; Rebs: Chen X. 6 Asts: Chen X. 6		Pts: Charles, Griner 18; Rebs: Griner 13; Asts: Moore 8

Youth Arena, Rio de Janeiro
Attendance: 2,957
Referees: Ferdinand Pascual (PHI), Robert Lottermoser (GER), Chahinaz Boussetta (MAR)

=== Quarterfinal ===
16 August 2016
18:45

Report

United States	110–64	Japan
Scoring by quarter: 30–23, 26–23, 25–13, 29–5
Pts: Moore, Taurasi 19; Rebs: Griner 7 Asts: Charles 5		Pts: Tokashiki 14; Rebs: four players 3 Asts: Yoshida 8

Carioca Arena 1, Rio de Janeiro
Attendance: 7,471
Referees: Carlos Peruga (ESP), Duan Zhu (CHN), Carlos Júlio (ANG)

=== Semifinal ===
18 August 2016
19:00

Report

France	67–86	United States
Scoring by quarter: 15–19, 21–21, 8–25, 23–21
Pts: Yacoubou 14; Rebs: Gruda 6 Asts: Michel 3		Pts: Taurasi 18; Rebs: Fowles 9 Asts: Taurasi 4

Carioca Arena 1, Rio de Janeiro
Attendance: 8,431
Referees: Ferdinand Pascual (PHI), Karen Lasuik (CAN), Duan Zhu (CHN)

=== Gold Medal Final ===
20 August 2016
15:30

Report

United States	101–72	Spain
Scoring by quarter: 21–17, 28–15, 32–17, 20–23
Pts: Whalen, Taurasi 17; Rebs: Charles, Griner 7 Asts: Whalen 6		Pts: Torrens 18; Rebs: Torrens, Ndour 5 Asts: Torrens, Cruz 4

Carioca Arena 1, Rio de Janeiro
Attendance: 9,586
Referees: Eddie Viator (FRA), Piotr Pastusiak (POL), Hwang In-tae (KOR)

== See also ==
- 2016 Summer Olympics
- Basketball at the 2016 Summer Olympics
- United States at the 2016 Summer Olympics
- United States women's national basketball team
