= Chen Xiaojia =

Chen Xiaojia is the name of:

- Chen Xiaojia (basketball) (born 1988), Chinese basketball player
- Chen Xiaojia (badminton) (born 1991), Chinese badminton player
