= Wu Di (basketball) =

Chinese basketball player (born 1993)

Wu Di 吴迪
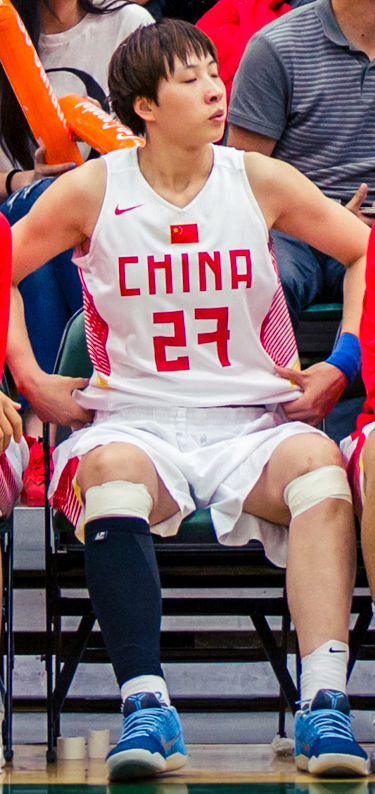
- Wu Di in 2016

Tianjin University of Finance and Economics
- Position: Shooting guard
- League: WCBA

Personal information
- Born: October 27, 1993 (age 33)
- Listed height: 6 ft 0 in (1.83 m)
Medals
Women's 3x3 basketball
Representing China
World Cup
Gold medal – first place	2019 Amsterdam	Team

Wu Di (born October 27, 1993) is a Chinese female international basketball player. She represented China in the women's basketball competition at the 2016 Summer Olympics.
