= Zhang Liting =

Chinese basketball player

No. 11 – Bayi Kylin
- Position: Center
- League: WCBA

Personal information
- Born: August 23, 1994 (age 32) Xiangfan, Hubei, China
- Listed height: 6 ft 6 in (1.98 m)

Career information
- Playing career: 2011–present

Career history
- 2011–present: Bayi Kylin

Zhang Liting (simplified Chinese: 张丽婷; traditional Chinese: 張麗婷; pinyin: Zhāng Lìtíng; born 23 August 1994) is a Chinese basketball player for Bayi Kylin and the Chinese national team, where she participated at the 2014 FIBA World Championship.
