= Cheng Feng (basketball) =

Chinese basketball player

Liaoning Hengye
- Position: Forward
- League: WCBA

Personal information
- Born: April 21, 1990 (age 36)
- Listed height: 6 ft 2 in (1.88 m)

Cheng Feng (Chinese: 程凤, born 21 April 1990) is a Chinese basketball player for Liaoning Hengye and the Chinese national team, where she participated at the 2014 FIBA World Championship.
