= Nadzeya Drozd =

Belarusian basketball player

Olimpia Grodno
- Position: Guard
- League: Belarusian League

Personal information
- Born: March 8, 1983 (age 43) Babruysk, Byelorussian SSR, Soviet Union
- Listed height: 5 ft 6 in (1.68 m)

Nadzeya Drozd (born 8 March 1983) is a Belarusian basketball player for Olimpia Grodno and the Belarusian national team, where she participated at the 2014 FIBA World Championship.
