= Bayi Kylin =

- League: Women's Chinese Basketball Association
- Arena: Nanchang International Sport Center (since 2017)
- Capacity: 8000
- Location: Nanchang, Jiangxi (since 2017)
- Affiliation(s): People's Liberation Army
- Championships: 5 (2002, 2003, 2004, 2005, 2008)

Bayi Kylin (Chinese: 八一麒麟; pinyin: Bāyī Qílín) is a Chinese women's professional basketball club in the Women's Chinese Basketball Association, owned by the People's Liberation Army. The team has been based in Honggutan New District, Nanchang, Jiangxi since 2017.

The kylin (also spelled qilin) is a mythical animal in Chinese culture.

== Season-by-season records ==
Season	Corporate Sponsor	Home City	Final Rank	Record (including playoffs)			Head coach
Season	Corporate Sponsor	Home City	Final Rank	W	L	%	Head coach
2002	Suzhou Zhong'an Plastic Industry	Suzhou, Jiangsu	Champion	16	1	94.1	Shan Ruirong
2002–03	Virjoy Box Tissue	Suzhou, Jiangsu	Champion	21	1	95.5	Shan Ruirong
2004	China Unicom	Changsha, Hunan	Champion	13	3	81.3	Shan Ruirong
2004–05	China Unicom	Changsha, Hunan	Champion	20	2	90.9	Shan Ruirong
2005–06	Zhejiang Guangbo Group (Guangbo Stationery)	Ningbo, Zhejiang	3rd	22	4	84.6	Shan Ruirong
2007	Zhejiang Guangbo Group (Guangbo Stationery)	Ningbo, Zhejiang	2nd	15	2	88.2	Fan Bin
2007–08	Zhejiang Guangbo Group (Guangbo Stationery)	Ningbo, Zhejiang	Champion	21	2	91.3	Fan Bin
2008–09	Zhejiang Guangbo Group (Guangbo Stationery)	Ningbo, Zhejiang	2nd	22	9	71.0	Wu Xinci
2009–10	Zhejiang Guangbo Group (Guangbo Stationery)	Ningbo, Zhejiang	3rd	19	7	73.1	Sui Feifei
2010–11	Zhejiang Guangbo Group (Guangbo Stationery)	Ningbo, Zhejiang	3rd	18	8	69.2	Sui Feifei
2011–12	Zhejiang Guangbo Group (Guangbo Stationery)	Ningbo, Zhejiang	10th	6	16	27.3	Sui Feifei
2012–13	Zhejiang Guangbo Group (Guangbo Stationery)	Ningbo, Zhejiang	10th	7	15	31.8	Ma Yuenan
2013–14	Zhejiang Guangbo Group (Guangbo Stationery)	Ningbo, Zhejiang	8th	9	15	37.5	Sui Feifei
2014–15	Zhejiang Guangbo Group (Guangbo Stationery)	Ningbo, Zhejiang	4th	16	20	44.4	Ma Yuenan
2015–16	Zhejiang Guangbo Group (Guangbo Stationery)	Ningbo, Zhejiang	6th	19	17	52.8	Ma Yuenan
2016–17	Zhejiang Guangbo Group (Guangbo Stationery)	Ningbo, Zhejiang	2nd	25	20	55.6	Ma Yuenan
2017–18	Honggutan New District	Nanchang, Jiangxi	10th	10	16	38.5	Ma Yuenan
2018–19	Honggutan New District	Nanchang, Jiangxi					Zhan Shuping

== Current roster ==
2018–19 Bayi Kylin roster
Players
Coaches

Pos.	No.	Nat.	Name	Ht.	Wt.	Age
PG	5	(China)	Jia Qiujiao	1.73 m (5 ft 8 in)	68 kg (150 lb)
G	6	(China)	Cai Xiaoyu	1.78 m (5 ft 10 in)	64 kg (141 lb)
SF	8	(China)	Wang Xuemeng	1.84 m (6 ft 0 in)	75 kg (165 lb)
SF	9	(China)	Li Meng	1.82 m (6 ft 0 in)	83 kg (183 lb)
F	10	(China)	Lu Wen	1.90 m (6 ft 3 in)	77 kg (170 lb)
C	11	(China)	Zhang Liting	1.98 m (6 ft 6 in)	88 kg (194 lb)
F	14	(China)	Mi Fengying	1.90 m (6 ft 3 in)	77 kg (170 lb)
SF	15	(China)	Jia Saiqi	1.86 m (6 ft 1 in)	78 kg (172 lb)
C	16	(China)	Liu Shuai	1.95 m (6 ft 5 in)	87 kg (192 lb)
C	18	(China)	Niu Jia	1.94 m (6 ft 4 in)	93 kg (205 lb)
SF	19	(China)	Zhao Shuang	1.84 m (6 ft 0 in)	66 kg (146 lb)
PF	21	(China)	Sun Mengran	1.95 m (6 ft 5 in)	85 kg (187 lb)
SG	22	(China)	Jin Jiabao	1.82 m (6 ft 0 in)	80 kg (176 lb)
C	24	(China)	Pan Zhenqi	1.93 m (6 ft 4 in)	86 kg (190 lb)

Head coach

- (China) Zhan Shuping

Assistant coach(es)

- (China) Shen Li
- (China) Hu Yun

Legend

- (C) Team captain
- Injured

== Notable former players ==
- Sui Feifei (2002–09)
- Ren Lei (2002–08, 2009–10)
- Zhang Xiaoni (2002–10)
- Chen Nan (2002–14, 2016–17)
- Shao Tingting (2005–08, 2010–11)
- Song Xiaoyun (2010–13)
- Sun Mengxin (2012–18)
- Wang Siyu (2014–15)
- Zhao Zhifang (2016–17)

== See also ==
PLA Military Sports Training Center
