= 2014 FIBA World Championship for Women =

2014 edition of the women's FIBA Basketball World Cup

2014 2014 FIBA World Championship for Women
2014 FIBA Dünya Kadınlar Şampiyonası

Tournament details
- Host country: Turkey
- Cities: Ankara; Istanbul
- Dates: 27 September – 5 October
- Teams: 16 (from 5 confederations)
- Venues: 3 (in 2 host cities)

Final positions
- Champions: United States (9th title)
- Runners-up: Spain
- Third place: Australia
- Fourth place: Turkey

Tournament statistics
- MVP: (United States) Maya Moore
- Top scorer: (Spain) Sancho Lyttle (18.2 points per game)

Official website
- www.fiba.basketball

The 2014 FIBA World Championship for Women, the 17th edition of the FIBA Women's World Championship, was held in Ankara and Istanbul, Turkey from 27 September to 5 October 2014.

This tournament implemented the new expanded free throw lane, the restricted arc, and extended 3-point line (6.6–6.75 m).

The United States defended their title and won their ninth overall gold medal by beating Spain 77–64 in the final. Australia defeated Turkey 74–44 to capture the bronze medal.

This was the last FIBA championship to use the name of "FIBA World Championship for Women". Shortly after the event, FIBA changed the name of the competition to the FIBA Women's Basketball World Cup, presumably to align its name with that of the corresponding men's competition.

== Venues ==
2014 FIBA World Championship for Women is located in Turkey
Istanbul		Ankara
Ülker Sports Arena	Abdi İpekçi Arena	Ankara Arena
Capacity: 13,000	Capacity: 11,000	Capacity: 10,400

== Format ==
This years' competition saw a format change. The 16 teams were split into four groups of four teams and played each other in a round-robin system. After all games were played, the top team of each group advanced to the quarterfinals, while the 2nd and 3rd best team of each group played in an elimination round. The last placed team of each group was eliminated.

The winners of the elimination round advanced to the quarterfinals, while the losers were eliminated. From the quarterfinals on a knockout stage was used to determine the winner. The places 1 to 8 will be played out.

== Qualification ==
16 teams took part in the 2014 World Championship for Women. After the 2012 Olympics, the continental allocation for FIBA Americas was reduced by one when the United States won the Olympic tournament, automatically qualifying them for the 2014 World Championship.

Event	Date	Location	Vacancies	Qualified
Host Nation	13 March 2011		1	Turkey
2012 Summer Olympics	29 July–12 August 2012	(United Kingdom) London	1	United States
EuroBasket Women 2013	15–30 June 2013	France	5	Spain; France; Serbia; Belarus; Czech Republic
2013 FIBA Oceania Championship for Women	14–18 August 2013	(New Zealand) Auckland (Australia) Canberra	1	Australia
2013 FIBA Africa Championship for Women	20–29 September 2013	(Mozambique) Maputo	2	Angola; Mozambique
2013 FIBA Americas Championship for Women	21–28 September 2013	(Mexico) Xalapa	3	Cuba; Canada; Brazil
2013 FIBA Asia Championship for Women	27 October–3 November 2013	(Thailand) Bangkok	3	Japan; South Korea; China
Total			16	

== Draw ==
The draw was held on 15 March 2014. The 16 teams were allocated to four pots of four teams.

=== Seedings ===
Included are the respective FIBA World Rankings for women:

Pot 1	Pot 2	Pot 3	Pot 4
Australia (2); Spain (6); France (4); United States (1)	Belarus (10); Czech Republic (5); Serbia (29); Turkey (13)	Brazil (7); Canada (9); China (8); Cuba (14)	Angola (20); Japan (17); South Korea (11); Mozambique (38)

== Preliminary round ==
All times are local (UTC+3).

=== Group A ===
Pos	Team	Pld	W	L	PF	PA	PD	Pts	Qualification
1	Spain	3	3	0	224	149	+75	6	Quarterfinals
2	Czech Republic	3	2	1	182	179	+3	5	Qualification round
3	Brazil	3	1	2	190	207	−17	4	Qualification round
4	Japan	3	0	3	163	224	−61	3	

Source: FIBA
Rules for classification: 1) Points; 2) Head-to-head results; 3) Points difference; 4) Points scored.

27 September 2014
16:15

Boxscore

Japan	50–74	Spain
Scoring by quarter: 13–21, 15–21, 4–24, 18–8
Pts: Tokashiki 19; Rebs: Tokashiki, O 7 Asts: Kudeken, Kurihara 4		Pts: Lyttle 19; Rebs: Lyttle 12; Asts: Xargay 6

Ankara Arena, Ankara
Attendance: 800
Referees: Jakub Zamojski (POL), Toni Caldwell (AUS), Jasmina Juras (SRB)

27 September 2014
21:15

Boxscore

Brazil	55–68	Czech Republic
Scoring by quarter: 7–17, 13–10, 16–23, 19–18
Pts: dos Santos 10; Rebs: dos Santos, de Souza 10; Asts: Paixão 3		Pts: Hanušová 15; Rebs: Veselá 11; Asts: Bartoňová 8

Ankara Arena, Ankara
Attendance: 3,200
Referees: Roberto Chiari (ITA), Kim Bo-hui (KOR), Roberto Oliveros (VEN)

28 September 2014
16:15

Boxscore

Czech Republic	71–57	Japan
Scoring by quarter: 18–16, 15–22, 20–13, 18–6
Pts: Kulichová 19; Rebs: Kulichová 9 Asts: Veselá, Bartoňová 4		Pts: Miyamoto 16; Rebs: Takada 7 Asts: Mamiya 4

Ankara Arena, Ankara
Attendance: 900
Referees: Fernando Sampietro (ARG), Babacar Guèye (SEN), Anne Panther (GER)

28 September 2014
21:15

Boxscore

Spain	83–56	Brazil
Scoring by quarter: 12–13, 29–13, 20–14, 22–16
Pts: Torrens, Lyttle 15; Rebs: Lyttle 13; Asts: Lyttle 5		Pts: de Souza 12; Rebs: de Souza 7 Asts: Pinto, Paixão 4

Ankara Arena, Ankara
Attendance: 1,500
Referees: Amy Bonner (USA), Tomas Jasevičius (LTU), Wang Zebo (CHN)

30 September 2014
14:00

Boxscore

Brazil	79–56	Japan
Scoring by quarter: 22–11, 19–20, 19–14, 19–11
Pts: Teixeira 27; Rebs: de Souza 11; Asts: Pinto 6		Pts: Mamiya 13; Rebs: Takada 9 Asts: Kudeken 4

Ankara Arena, Ankara
Attendance: 500
Referees: Jakub Zamojski (POL), Toni Caldwell (AUS), Roberto Oliveros (VEN)

30 September 2014
16:15

Boxscore

Spain	67–43	Czech Republic
Scoring by quarter: 14–9, 20–12, 14–13, 19–9
Pts: Lyttle 17; Rebs: Lyttle 14; Asts: Torrens, Palau 4		Pts: Bartoňová 8 Rebs: Kulichová 9 Asts: Bartoňová 4

Ankara Arena, Ankara
Attendance: 600
Referees: Roberto Chiari (ITA), Jasmina Juras (SRB), Wang Zebo (CHN)

=== Group B ===
Pos	Team	Pld	W	L	PF	PA	PD	Pts	Qualification
1	Turkey	3	3	0	169	146	+23	6	Quarterfinals
2	France	3	2	1	200	154	+46	5	Qualification round
3	Canada	3	1	2	172	172	0	4	Qualification round
4	Mozambique	3	0	3	153	222	−69	3	

Source: FIBA
Rules for classification: 1) Points; 2) Head-to-head results; 3) Points difference; 4) Points scored.

27 September 2014
14:00

Boxscore

Mozambique	54–69	Canada
Scoring by quarter: 18–22, 14–13, 10–18, 12–16
Pts: Muianga 14; Rebs: Dongue 10; Asts: Ngulela 6		Pts: three players 11; Rebs: Gaucher, Ayim 7 Asts: three players 4

Ankara Arena, Ankara
Attendance: 700
Referees: Anne Panther (GER), Babacar Guèye (SEN), Wang Zebo (CHN)

27 September 2014
19:00

Boxscore

Turkey	50–48	France
Scoring by quarter: 14–15, 3–12, 21–10, 12–11
Pts: Pringle 13; Rebs: Pringle 7 Asts: three players 3		Pts: Gruda 11; Rebs: Gruda 13; Asts: Dumerc 5

Ankara Arena, Ankara
Attendance: 10,000
Referees: Amy Bonner (USA), Tomas Jasevičius (LTU), Fernando Sampietro (ARG)

28 September 2014
14:00

Boxscore

France	89–45	Mozambique
Scoring by quarter: 20–13, 27–8, 24–10, 18–14
Pts: Gruda 19; Rebs: Gruda 7 Asts: Dumerc, Skrela 6		Pts: Dongue 18; Rebs: Dongue 11; Asts: Ngulela 6

Ankara Arena, Ankara
Attendance: 500
Referees: Jasmina Juras (SRB), Kim Bo-hui (KOR), Jakub Zamojski (POL)

28 September 2014
19:00

Boxscore

Canada	44–55	Turkey
Scoring by quarter: 17–17, 5–7, 9–7, 13–25
Pts: Gaucher, K. Plouffe 9 Rebs: three players 5 Asts: Gaucher 2		Pts: Pringle 18; Rebs: Alben, Pringle 6 Asts: Vardarlı 6

Ankara Arena, Ankara
Attendance: 10,000
Referees: Roberto Chiari (ITA), Toni Caldwell (AUS), Roberto Oliveros (VEN)

30 September 2014
19:00

Boxscore

Mozambique	54–64	Turkey
Scoring by quarter: 12–18, 11–18, 15–19, 16–9
Pts: Dongue 17; Rebs: Dongue 14; Asts: Cossa 6		Pts: İvegin 13; Rebs: Çağlar 9 Asts: Palazoğlu 4

Ankara Arena, Ankara
Attendance: 9,600
Referees: Amy Bonner (USA), Babacar Guèye (SEN), Tomas Jasevičius (LTU)

30 September 2014
21:15

Boxscore

France	63–59	Canada
Scoring by quarter: 15–17, 16–13, 16–13, 16–16
Pts: Gruda 13; Rebs: three players 6 Asts: Gruda, Dumerc 3		Pts: Tatham 11; Rebs: M. Plouffe 5 Asts: Langolis 5

Ankara Arena, Ankara
Attendance: 1,800
Referees: Fernando Sampietro (ARG), Kim Bo-hui (KOR), Anne Panther (GER)

=== Group C ===
Pos	Team	Pld	W	L	PF	PA	PD	Pts	Qualification
1	Australia	3	3	0	264	156	+108	6	Quarterfinals
2	Belarus	3	2	1	185	220	−35	5	Qualification round
3	Cuba	3	1	2	199	217	−18	4	Qualification round
4	South Korea	3	0	3	175	230	−55	3	

Source: FIBA
Rules for classification: 1) Points; 2) Head-to-head results; 3) Points difference; 4) Points scored.

27 September 2014
14:15

Boxscore

Cuba	57–90	Australia
Scoring by quarter: 6–23, 25–22, 7–23, 19–22
Pts: Amargo 19; Rebs: Cepeda, Noblet 7 Asts: Casanova 3		Pts: Taylor 20; Rebs: Jarry, Snell 6 Asts: Mitchell 8

Abdi İpekçi Arena, Istanbul
Attendance: 675
Referees: Elena Chernova (RUS), José Fernández (CRC), Robert Vyklický (CZE)

27 September 2014
16:30

Boxscore

South Korea	64–70	Belarus
Scoring by quarter: 23–11, 7–21, 15–23, 19–15
Pts: Park J-s. 15; Rebs: Lee S-a. 8 Asts: Lee S-a. 7		Pts: Snytsina 17; Rebs: Leuchanka 11; Asts: Leuchanka 6

Abdi İpekçi Arena, Istanbul
Attendance: 750
Referees: Karen Lasuik (CAN), Snehal Bendke (IND), Adrian Nunes (URU)

28 September 2014
14:15

Boxscore

Australia	87–54	South Korea
Scoring by quarter: 25–9, 20–13, 21–15, 21–17
Pts: Hodges 14; Rebs: Richards, Burton 6 Asts: Phillips 7		Pts: Kim Y-j. 17; Rebs: Lee S-a. 8 Asts: Shin J-h., Lee S-a. 3

Abdi İpekçi Arena, Istanbul
Attendance: 450
Referees: Carole Delauné (FRA), Abdelaziz Abassi (TUN), Özlem Yalman (TUR)

28 September 2014
19:15

Boxscore

Belarus	70–69	Cuba
Scoring by quarter: 15–22, 20–15, 15–19, 20–13
Pts: Leuchanka 20; Rebs: Leuchanka 18; Asts: Drozd 4		Pts: Oquendo 19; Rebs: Oquendo 10; Asts: Casanova 10

Abdi İpekçi Arena, Istanbul
Attendance: 470
Referees: Renaud Geller (BEL), Antonio Conde (ESP), Guilherme Locatelli (BRA)

30 September 2014
16:30

Boxscore

Australia	87–45	Belarus
Scoring by quarter: 24–13, 22–8, 19–11, 22–13
Pts: Jarry 19; Rebs: Francis 8 Asts: Phillips 7		Pts: Leuchanka 12; Rebs: Leuchanka 10; Asts: three players 2

Abdi İpekçi Arena, Istanbul
Attendance: 250
Referees: Karen Lasuik (CAN), Abdelaziz Abassi (TUN), Adrian Nunes (URU)

30 September 2014
19:15

Boxscore

South Korea	57–73	Cuba
Scoring by quarter: 15–18, 13–16, 18–23, 11–16
Pts: Park J-s. 16; Rebs: Kim S-y 8 Asts: Hong A-r., Lee S-a. 2		Pts: Cepeda 16; Rebs: Cepeda 17; Asts: Gelis 5

Abdi İpekçi Arena, Istanbul
Attendance: 250
Referees: Elena Chernova (RUS), Carole Delauné (FRA), Robert Vyklický (CZE)

=== Group D ===
Pos	Team	Pld	W	L	PF	PA	PD	Pts	Qualification
1	United States	3	3	0	300	174	+126	6	Quarterfinals
2	Serbia	3	2	1	241	199	+42	5	Qualification round
3	China	3	1	2	184	191	−7	4	Qualification round
4	Angola	3	0	3	125	286	−161	3	

Source: FIBA
Rules for classification: 1) Points; 2) Head-to-head results; 3) Points difference; 4) Points scored.

27 September 2014
19:15

Boxscore

Serbia	102–42	Angola
Scoring by quarter: 22–10, 24–8, 27–18, 29–6
Pts: Milovanović 16; Rebs: Radočaj 6 Asts: A. Dabović 6		Pts: Eusébio, Tomás 9 Rebs: Tomás, Maurício 5 Asts: Eusébio, Guadalupe 2

Abdi İpekçi Arena, Istanbul
Attendance: 650
Referees: Antonio Conde (ESP), Abdelaziz Abassi (TUN), Carole Delauné (FRA)

27 September 2014
21:30

Boxscore

China	56–87	United States
Scoring by quarter: 13–20, 19–19, 8–21, 16–27
Pts: Chen X., Sun M. 10; Rebs: Gao S., Zhang L. 6 Asts: Yang L., Sun M. 2		Pts: Moore, Griner 15; Rebs: Charles 15; Asts: four players 3

Abdi İpekçi Arena, Istanbul
Attendance: 1,100
Referees: Guilherme Locatelli (BRA), Renaud Geller (BEL), Özlem Yalman (TUR)

28 September 2014
16:30

Boxscore

Angola	39–65	China
Scoring by quarter: 10–15, 5–15, 12–22, 12–13
Pts: Maurício 18; Rebs: Guadalupe 7 Asts: Filipe 2		Pts: Shao T. 14; Rebs: Cheng F., Zhang L. 6 Asts: Chen X. 6

Abdi İpekçi Arena, Istanbul
Attendance: 420
Referees: Elena Chernova (RUS), Karen Lasuik (CAN), Adrian Nunes (URU)

28 September 2014
21:30

Boxscore

United States	94–74	Serbia
Scoring by quarter: 17–21, 32–21, 21–22, 24–10
Pts: Taurasi 20; Rebs: Moore 12; Asts: Moore 6		Pts: A. Dabović 24; Rebs: Milovanović 9 Asts: M. Dabović, A. Dabović 3

Abdi İpekçi Arena, Istanbul
Attendance: 700
Referees: Robert Vyklický (CZE), Snehal Bendke (IND), José Fernández (CRC)

30 September 2014
14:15

Boxscore

Serbia	65–63	China
Scoring by quarter: 25–22, 16–12, 8–17, 16–12
Pts: Radočaj 19; Rebs: Krnjić 7 Asts: Butulija 3		Pts: Lu W. 20; Rebs: Chen X., Huang H. 8 Asts: Lu W. 4

Abdi İpekçi Arena, Istanbul
Attendance: 200
Referees: Antonio Conde (ESP), José Fernández (CRC), Guilherme Locatelli (BRA)

30 September 2014
21:30

Boxscore

United States	119–44	Angola
Scoring by quarter: 33–11, 28–14, 31–6, 27–13
Pts: Ogwumike 18; Rebs: Ogwumike 10; Asts: Whalen 6		Pts: Manuel 11; Rebs: Manuel 4 Asts: four players 1

Abdi İpekçi Arena, Istanbul
Attendance: 400
Referees: Renaud Geller (BEL), Snehal Bendke (IND), Özlem Yalman (TUR)

== Final round ==
Elimination round 1 October 2014
Belarus	67
China	72
Serbia	86
Cuba	79
Czech Republic	71
Canada	91
France	61
Brazil	48

Quarterfinals; 3 October 2014
Spain	71
China	55
Turkey	62
Serbia	61
Australia	63
Canada	52
United States	94
France	72

Semifinals; 4 October 2014
Spain	66
Turkey	56
Australia	70
United States	82

Final; 5 October 2014
Spain	64
United States	77
Third place
Turkey	44
Australia	74

5–8th place bracket

5–8th place semi-finals
4 October 2014
China	85
Serbia	69
4 October 2014
Canada	55
France	40

Fifth place game
5 October 2014
China	53
Canada	61
Seventh place game
5 October 2014
Serbia	74
France	88

=== Elimination round ===
1 October 2014
16:15

Boxscore

Czech Republic	71–91	Canada
Scoring by quarter: 13–22, 19–22, 23–21, 16–26
Pts: Vítečková 17; Rebs: Veselá 5 Asts: Elhotová 4		Pts: Gaucher 17; Rebs: Gaucher 7 Asts: M. Plouffe 3

Ankara Arena, Ankara
Attendance: 450
Referees: Amy Bonner (USA), Wang Zebo (CHN), Jakub Zamojski (POL)

1 October 2014
19:00

Boxscore

France	61–48	Brazil
Scoring by quarter: 12–10, 14–5, 19–15, 16–18
Pts: Gruda 17; Rebs: Gruda 8 Asts: Dumerc 9		Pts: Souza 11; Rebs: Pinto 7 Asts: Pinto 4

Ankara Arena, Ankara
Attendance: 450
Referees: Roberto Chiari (ITA), Toni Caldwell (AUS), Jasmina Juras (SRB)

1 October 2014
19:15

Boxscore

Belarus	67–72	China
Scoring by quarter: 20–19, 23–13, 17–15, 7–25
Pts: Likhtarovich 20; Rebs: Leuchanka 13; Asts: Leuchanka 9		Pts: Shao T. 23; Rebs: Lu W. 8 Asts: six players 2

Abdi İpekçi Arena, Istanbul
Attendance: 300
Referees: Robert Vyklický (CZE), Snehal Bendke (IND), Carole Delauné (FRA)

1 October 2014
21:30

Boxscore

Serbia	86–79	Cuba
Scoring by quarter: 16–23, 26–16, 18–23, 26–17
Pts: A. Dabović 21; Rebs: Milovanović 9 Asts: four players 2		Pts: Cepeda 18; Rebs: Cepeda 8 Asts: Gelis 8

Abdi İpekçi Arena, Istanbul
Attendance: 350
Referees: Renaud Geller (BEL), Karen Lasuik (CAN), Guilherme Locatelli (BRA)

=== Quarterfinals ===
3 October 2014
14:00

Boxscore

Australia	63–52	Canada
Scoring by quarter: 19–17, 17–7, 15–11, 12–17
Pts: Phillips 16; Rebs: Tolo 9 Asts: Taylor 5		Pts: Ayim 11; Rebs: Ayim 7 Asts: Thorburn, Fields 2

Ülker Sports Arena, Istanbul
Attendance: 500
Referees: Tomas Jasevičius (LTU), Antonio Conde (ESP), Özlem Yalman (TUR)

3 October 2014
16:15

Boxscore

Spain	71–55	China
Scoring by quarter: 20–9, 15–8, 21–18, 15–20
Pts: Lyttle 24; Rebs: Nicholls 14; Asts: Torrens, Palau 5		Pts: Li M., Sun M. 10; Rebs: Gao S. 8 Asts: Chen X. 5

Ülker Sports Arena, Istanbul
Attendance: 700
Referees: Fernando Sampietro (ARG), Kim Bo-hui (KOR), Roberto Oliveros (VEN)

3 October 2014
19:00

Boxscore

Turkey	62–61	Serbia
Scoring by quarter: 18–13, 6–17, 17–10, 21–21
Pts: Pringle 14; Rebs: Pringle 19; Asts: Palazoğlu 4		Pts: M. Dabović 18; Rebs: Ajduković 8 Asts: Radočaj 7

Ülker Sports Arena, Istanbul
Attendance: 9,500
Referees: Roberto Chiari (ITA), Elena Chernova (RUS), Jakub Zamojski (POL)

3 October 2014
21:15

Boxscore

United States	94–72	France
Scoring by quarter: 29–14, 24–18, 19–16, 22–24
Pts: Griner 17; Rebs: Charles 7 Asts: Taurasi 6		Pts: Gruda 18; Rebs: Gruda 9 Asts: Salagnac 4

Ülker Sports Arena, Istanbul
Attendance: 3,600
Referees: Guilherme Locatelli (BRA), Adrian Nunes (URU), Anne Panther (GER)

=== 5–8th place semifinals ===
4 October 2014
14.00

Boxscore

China	85–69	Serbia
Scoring by quarter: 32–22, 11–14, 21–20, 21–13
Pts: Shao T. 24; Rebs: Lu W. 8 Asts: Sun M. 4		Pts: M. Dabović 12; Rebs: Krnjić, Ajduković 6 Asts: Radočaj 4

Ülker Sports Arena, Istanbul
Attendance: 200
Referees: Amy Bonner (USA), José Fernández (CRC), Karen Lasuik (CAN)

4 October 2014
16:15

Boxscore

Canada	55–40	France
Scoring by quarter: 15–8, 22–8, 10–16, 8–8
Pts: Ayim 12; Rebs: four players 5 Asts: Thorburn, Tatham 4		Pts: Tchatchouang 12; Rebs: Gruda 12; Asts: Lardy 2

Ülker Sports Arena, Istanbul
Attendance: 200
Referees: Tomas Jasevičius (LTU), Toni Caldwell (AUS), Özlem Yalman (TUR)

=== Semifinals ===
4 October 2014
19:00

Boxscore

Spain	66–56	Turkey
Scoring by quarter: 19–20, 9–7, 13–12, 25–17
Pts: Torrens 28; Rebs: Lyttle 12; Asts: three players 3		Pts: Yılmaz, Pringle 18; Rebs: Pringle 8 Asts: Alben 4

Ülker Sports Arena, Istanbul
Attendance: 9,200
Referees: Fernando Sampietro (ARG), Guilherme Locatelli (BRA), Anne Panther (GER)

4 October 2014
21:15

Boxscore

Australia	70–82	United States
Scoring by quarter: 16–19, 14–23, 22–19, 18–21
Pts: Phillips 19; Rebs: Taylor, Tolo 6 Asts: Taylor 4		Pts: Charles 18; Rebs: Charles 9 Asts: Moore 5

Ülker Sports Arena, Istanbul
Attendance: 3,600
Referees: Renaud Geller (BEL), Robert Vyklický (CZE), Wang Zebo (CHN)

=== Seventh place game ===
5 October 2014
14:00

Boxscore

Serbia	74–88	France
Scoring by quarter: 20–19, 14–22, 19–19, 21–28
Pts: A. Dabović 19; Rebs: Krnjić 6 Asts: A. Dabović 4		Pts: Cata-Chitiga 16; Rebs: Cata-Chitiga 13; Asts: three players 5

Ülker Sports Arena, Istanbul
Attendance: 200
Referees: Robert Vyklický (CZE), Snehal Bendke (IND), Babacar Guèye (SEN)

=== Fifth place game ===
5 October 2014
16:15

Boxscore

China	53–61	Canada
Scoring by quarter: 15–13, 11–19, 15–14, 12–15
Pts: Shao T. 12; Rebs: Shao T., Lu W. 7 Asts: Cheng F. 2		Pts: Gaucher 16; Rebs: Ayim 9 Asts: three players 3

Ülker Sports Arena, Istanbul
Attendance: 250
Referees: Adrian Nunes (URU), Abdelaziz Abassi (TUN), Carole Delauné (FRA)

=== Third place game ===
5 October 2014
19:00

Boxscore

Turkey	44–74	Australia
Scoring by quarter: 4–17, 15–21, 7–16, 18–20
Pts: Yılmaz 13; Rebs: Pringle 8 Asts: Palazoğlu 4		Pts: Tolo 21; Rebs: Burton 7 Asts: Taylor 9

Ülker Sports Arena, Istanbul
Attendance: 7,000
Referees: Antonio Conde (ESP), Amy Bonner (USA), Roberto Oliveros (VEN)

=== Final ===
5 October 2014
21:15

Boxscore

Spain	64–77	United States
Scoring by quarter: 17–28, 12–20, 19–19, 16–10
Pts: Lyttle 16; Rebs: Nicholls, Lyttle 11; Asts: Lyttle 4		Pts: Moore 18; Rebs: Charles 8 Asts: Taurasi 8

Ülker Sports Arena, Istanbul
Attendance: 5,600
Referees: Roberto Chiari (ITA), Jasmina Juras (SRB), Karen Lasuik (CAN)

== Final standings ==
Rank	Team	Record
1st place, gold medalist(s)	United States	6–0
2nd place, silver medalist(s)	Spain	5–1
3rd place, bronze medalist(s)	Australia	5–1
4	Turkey	4–2
5	Canada	4–3
6	China	3–4
7	France	4–3
8	Serbia	3–4
9	Czech Republic	2–2
10	Belarus	2–2
11	Brazil	1–3
12	Cuba	1–3
13	South Korea	0–3
14	Japan	0–3
15	Mozambique	0–3
16	Angola	0–3

Qualified for the 2016 Summer Olympics

== Awards ==
2014 FIBA World Championship for Women

United States
9th title

Most Valuable Player
(United States) Maya Moore

=== All-Tournament Team ===
The all-star five was revealed on 5 October 2014.

- (United States) Maya Moore
- (United States) Brittney Griner
- (Spain) Alba Torrens
- (Spain) Sancho Lyttle
- (Australia) Penny Taylor

== Statistical leaders ==
Points

Name	PPG
(Spain) Sancho Lyttle	18.2
(Cuba) Yamara Amargo	16.0
(Spain) Alba Torrens	15.5
(United States) Maya Moore	15.3
(France) Sandrine Gruda	14.7

Rebounds

Name	RPG
(Belarus) Yelena Leuchanka	13.0
(Spain) Sancho Lyttle	11.5
(Cuba) Marlen Cepeda	10.0
(Spain) Laura Nicholls	9.2
(France) Sandrine Gruda	8.8

Assists

Name	APG
(Cuba) Ineidis Casanova	5.8
(Australia) Penny Taylor (Belarus) Yelena Leuchanka	4.8
(United States) Diana Taurasi (Czech Republic) Kateřina Bartoňová (Cuba) Oyanaisis Gelis	4.5

Blocks

Name	BPG
(Turkey) LaToya Pringle	2.7
(United States) Brittney Griner	2.0
(Czech Republic) Jana Veselá	1.3
(Turkey) Tuğçe Canıtez (France) Sandrine Gruda	1.2

Steals

Name	SPG
(Spain) Sancho Lyttle	3.3
(Brazil) Adriana Moisés Pinto	2.3
(Serbia) Milica Dabović	1.9
(Spain) Laura Nicholls (Czech Republic) Kateřina Bartoňová (Czech Republic) Jana Veselá	1.8

== Referees ==
The following referees were selected for the tournament.

- (Argentina) Fernando Sampietro
- (Australia) Toni Caldwell
- (Belgium) Renaud Geller
- (Brazil) Guilherme Locatelli
- (Canada) Karen Lasuik
- (China) Wang Zebo
- (Costa Rica) José Fernández
- (Czech Republic) Robert Vyklický
- (France) Carole Delauné
- (Germany) Anne Panther
- (India) Snehal Bendke
- (Italy) Roberto Chiari
- (South Korea) Kim Bo-hui
- (Lithuania) Tomas Jasevičius
- (Poland) Jakub Zamojski
- (Russia) Elena Chernova
- (Senegal) Babacar Guèye
- (Serbia) Jasmina Juras
- (Spain) Antonio Conde
- (Tunisia) Abdelaziz Abassi
- (Turkey) Serkan Emlek
- (Turkey) Özlem Yalman
- (Turkey) Yener Yılmaz
- (Uruguay) Adrian Nunes
- (United States) Amy Bonner
- (Venezuela) Roberto Oliveros
