= Penny Taylor =

Australian basketball player (born 1981)

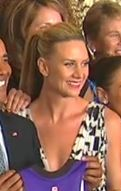
- Taylor at the White House in 2014

Personal information
- Born: 24 May 1981 (age 45) Melbourne, Victoria, Australia
- Listed height: 6 ft 1 in (1.85 m)
- Listed weight: 165 lb (75 kg)

Career information
- WNBA draft: 2001: 1st round, 11th overall pick
- Drafted by: Cleveland Rockers
- Playing career: 1997–2016
- Position: Small forward
- Number: 14, 13

Career history

Playing
- 1997–1999: Australian Institute of Sport
- 1999–2002: Dandenong Rangers
- 2001–2003: Cleveland Rockers
- 2002–2003: Termocarispe La Spezia
- 2003–2007: Famila Schio
- 2004–2014: Phoenix Mercury
- 2007–2009: UMMC Ekaterinburg
- 2009–2013: Fenerbahçe Istanbul
- 2014–2015: Dandenong Rangers
- 2015–2016: Shanxi Flame
- 2016: Phoenix Mercury

Coaching
- 2019: Phoenix Mercury (asst.)

Career highlights
- 3× WNBA champion (2007, 2009, 2014); 3× WNBA All-Star (2002, 2007, 2011); All-WNBA First Team (2007); All-WNBA Second Team (2011); WNBL champion (1999); No. 13 retired by Phoenix Mercury; 3× WNBL All-Star Five (2001, 2002, 2015); 2× WNBL Top Shooter Award (2001, 2002); FIBA World Championship MVP (2006)
- Stats at WNBA.com
- Stats at Basketball Reference
- Women's Basketball Hall of Fame
Medals
Women's basketball
Representing Australia
Olympic Games
Silver medal – second place	2004 Athens	Team
Silver medal – second place	2008 Beijing	Team
World Championship
Gold medal – first place	2006 Brazil	Team
Bronze medal – third place	2002 China	Team
Bronze medal – third place	2014 Turkey	Team

Penelope Jane Taylor (born 24 May 1981) is an Australian former professional basketball player and assistant coach. During her 19-year career, Taylor won the WNBL title with her first club, the Australian Institute of Sport, and claimed league titles in Italy, Turkey, Russia and the WNBA.

As part of the Australian woman's national team, Taylor won two Olympic medals and led the Australian Opals to a gold medal at the World Championships, winning tournament MVP honours ahead of teammate Lauren Jackson.

She also spent several offseasons with the Phoenix Mercury of the WNBA, where she won three championships.

== Early life ==
Penny Taylor was born in Melbourne, Victoria to English parents Michael Taylor and Denna Taylor. She has a younger brother named Phillip and older sister named Heather. Her parents enrolled Taylor in the Belgrave South Red Devils basketball club at the age of four. The camaraderie helped Taylor overcome her shyness, and eventually move to the Nunawading Spectres. She attended Upwey High School in Upwey, Victoria, and after graduating earned a scholarship to the Australian Institute of Sport in Canberra.

Taylor holds a UK passport due to her parents' origin.

== WNBL career ==
Taylor debuted in the Women's National Basketball League playing for the AIS (Australian Institute of Sport) starting in 1997–98, winning the WNBL title the following season. Afterwards she moved to Dandenong Rangers, where she remained from 1999 to 2002. Taylor led the league in scoring with 25.5 points per game and steals with 2.5 steals per game during the 2000–01 season, being named the WNBL MVP in that season and the next.

After 12 years away from the Australian league, Taylor signed with the Rangers for the 2014–15 WNBL season. Her main intention for the return was to stay close to her family, playing in front of her nephews while also tending for her cancer-ridden father. She scored 20.2 points a game from 17 matches in qualifying the Rangers for the playoffs. During the semifinals against the Sydney Uni Flames, the Rangers were 15 points ahead when Taylor injured her ankle with eight minutes remaining, and her absence was enough for Sydney to take over and win the game.

== Overseas career ==
Taylor played in Europe for La Spezia and Famila Schio (winning Serie A and the Coppa Italia twice apiece), Russia for UMMC Ekaterinburg (winning one Russian League) and Türkiye with Fenerbahce (four Turkish Leagues and one Turkish Cup).

The 2015-16 season, her final as a professional, had Taylor in the Shanxi Flame of the Women's Chinese Basketball Association, averaging 23.9 points, 7.1 rebounds and 4.2 assists.

== WNBA career ==
Taylor was selected by the Cleveland Rockers in the first round (11th overall) during the annual WNBA draft on 20 April 2001. She starred for the Rockers for three seasons.

In January 2004, the WNBA held a dispersal draft, where the league's existing teams selected former players from the Rockers team. Taylor was selected as the first overall pick by the Phoenix Mercury.

In July 2007 she was chosen as a reserve for the WNBA All Star game. On 16 September 2007, Penny Taylor along with Diana Taurasi and Cappie Pondexter led the Phoenix Mercury to the WNBA championship defeating the Detroit Shock in the final game 5 of the finals, 108–92, they became the first team to end out a finals series at an away venue in the WNBA.

Taylor sat out most of the 2009 season after having ankle surgery that required nine weeks of recovery, but returned to the Mercury mid-season and averaged 10.7 points off the bench. The Mercury went on to win the WNBA Championship that year, beating the Indiana Fever in five games, with Taylor making two clutch free throws down the stretch to help clinch the decisive game 94–86.

In 2012, Taylor suffered an anterior cruciate ligament injury of her left knee playing in Türkiye for Fenerbahce. Her year-long recovery in Australia had Taylor going through three knee operations, including one to remove floating cartilage revealed in a magnetic resonance imaging exam, and seeing her mother die of cancer. Taylor's return to the Mercury in 2013 eventually had her other knee give in after six games, leading her to further surgery.

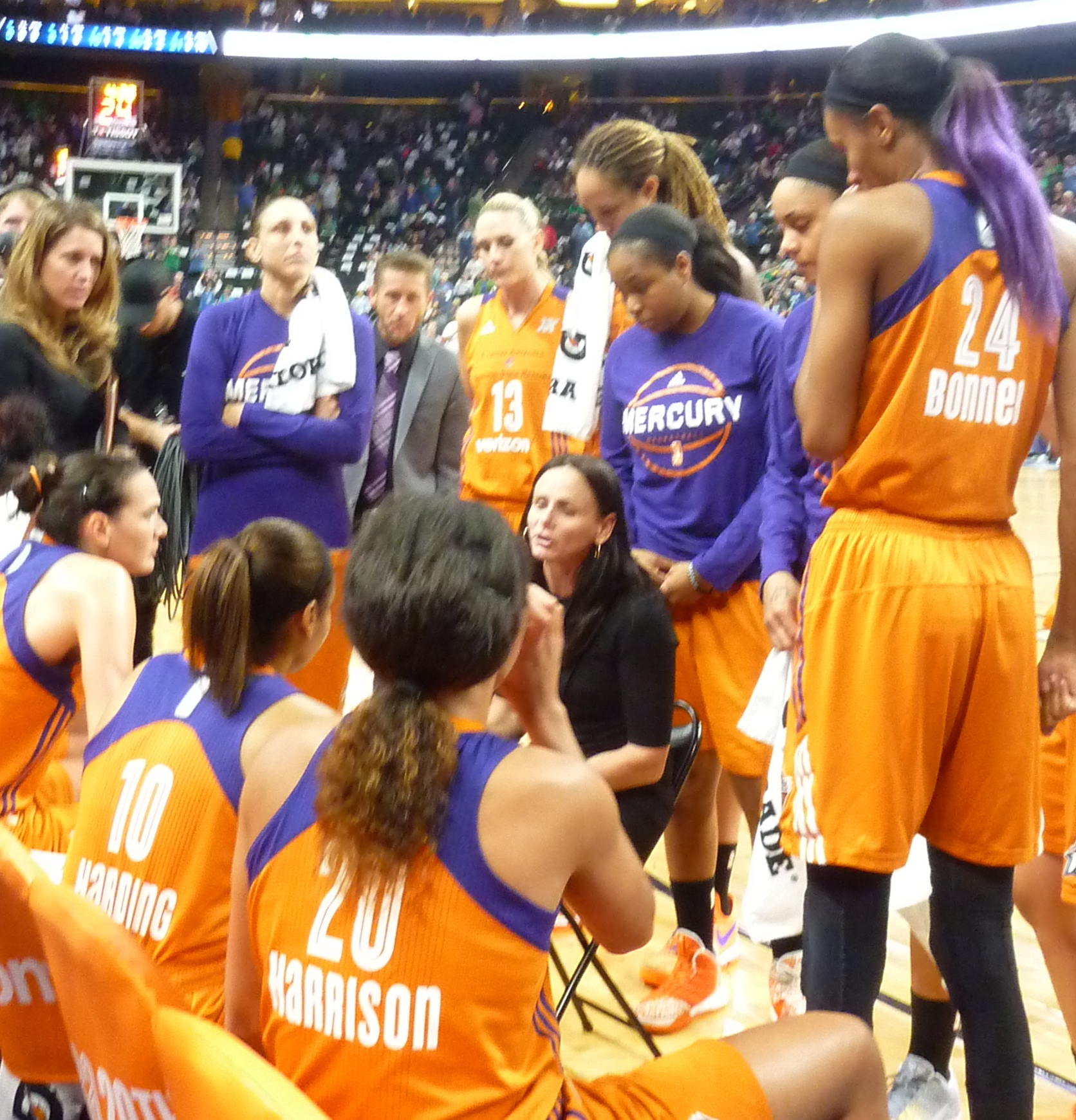
Penny Taylor (number 13) with the Mercury during her final season with the team.

Taylor spent the 2014 pre-season working with both the Mercury and the Phoenix Suns health staff to make sure her return to basketball worked. Under new coach and former Australia teammate Sandy Brondello, Taylor saw limited minutes during the first eleven games of the 2014 WNBA season. Once Brondello saw her recovered enough, Taylor returned as a Mercury starter, and the team would then go on to win the following 16 games, the longest win streak in franchise history and not lose again at home for the remainder of the 2014 season. Taylor's return helped lead the team to the best result in the Western Conference with an average of 10.5 points a game for 33 games, as well as the best record in league history with 29 wins and 5 losses, only one of whom had Taylor as a starter. The Mercury returned to the WNBA Finals, winning the title against the Chicago Sky. An unsigned free agent in 2015, she decided to sit out the 2015 season for personal reasons after the loss of her father. The Mercury re-signed her on 8 February 2016, and Taylor was present right at the first game to start her thirteenth season at the WNBA. Prior to the August break for the Olympics, Taylor announced she would retire at the end of the season. Her last career game happened on 2 October in Phoenix, as the Mercury were swept by the Minnesota Lynx in the WNBA semifinals.

== International basketball ==
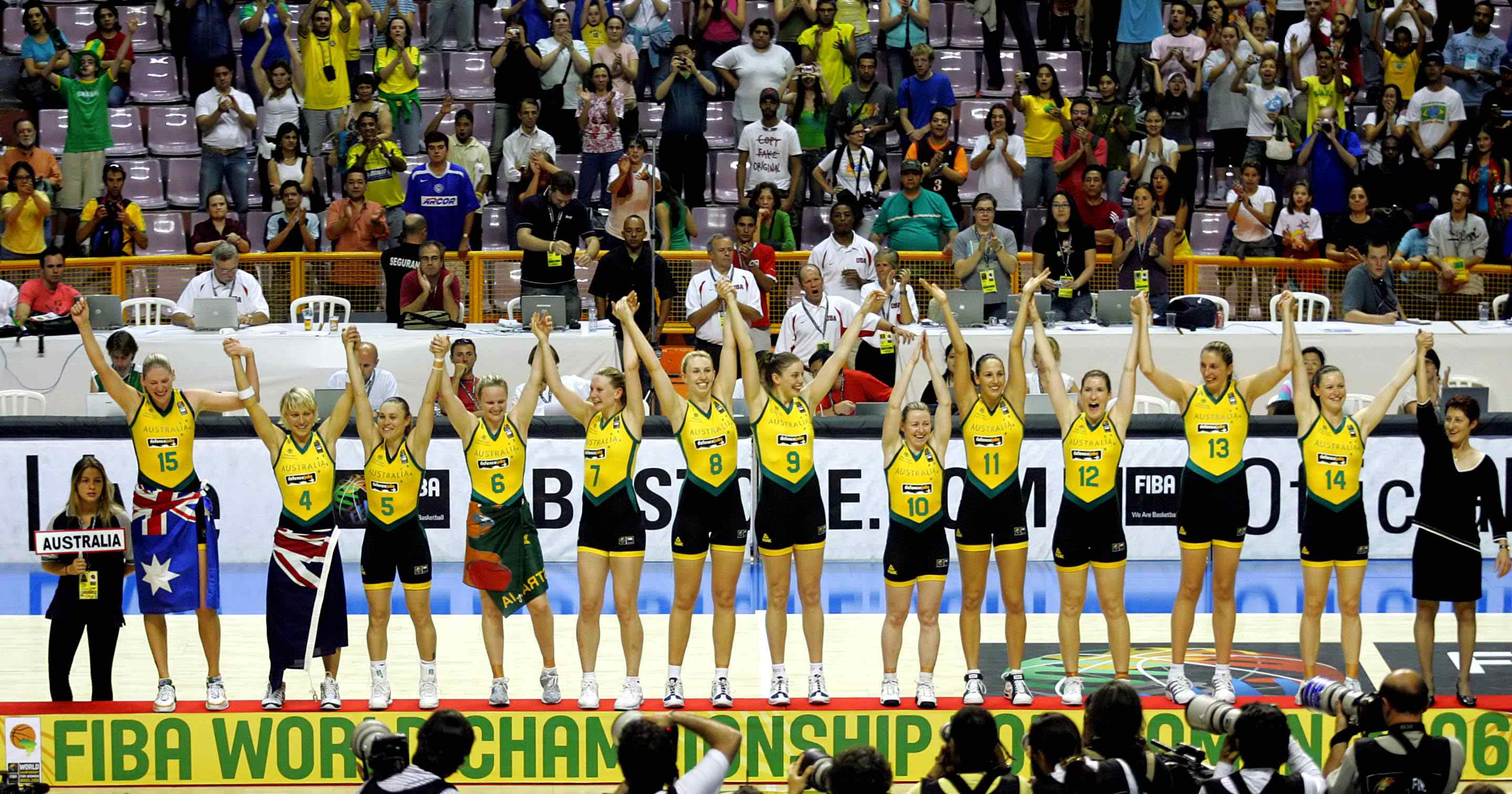
Taylor (number 7) and the Opals at the podium for the 2006 World Championship, where she was chosen Most Valuable Player.

Taylor was a regular member of the Australian national team, the 'Opals', since 2002, when won a bronze medal in the 2002 World Championship. Her biggest accomplishment was winning the 2006 World Championship in Brazil, where Taylor was named Most Valuable Player of the championship.

They won silver medals in consecutive Olympiads: Athens 2004 and Beijing 2008. She was unable to play for the Opals at the 2012 Summer Olympics after injuring herself playing in Türkiye for Fenerbahçe.

Taylor was named Australian Opals captain for the 2014 World Championship, helping the team win the bronze medal, and was named to the All-Star Five. Her last tournament with the Opals was at Rio 2016, where Australia fell in the quarterfinals.

== Coaching career ==
In March 2017, Taylor became the Director of Player Development and Performance for her former WNBA team, the Phoenix Mercury. After giving birth to a son in March 2018, Taylor took a year off from coaching. In April 2019, the Mercury announced that Taylor had been hired as an assistant coach. It was announced on 6 July 2020 that Taylor would step down as assistant coach of the Mercury to focus on being a full-time mother.

== Personal life ==
Taylor was married in 2005 to Brazilian volleyball player Rodrigo Rodrigues Gil, but they later divorced.

After dating for eight years, on 13 May 2017, she married fellow Phoenix Mercury star Diana Taurasi.

On 1 March 2018, the couple welcomed their first child when Taylor gave birth to their son Leo Michael Taurasi-Taylor.

Taylor expected to give birth to the couple's second child on October 6, 2021, but the pregnancy lasted beyond the due date. After a Game 4 loss in the semifinals, Taurasi played in a winner-take-all Game 5 that would decide whether the Phoenix Mercury would play in the 2021 WNBA finals. After a Game 5 win on October 8, 2021, Taurasi had a message for Taylor in her post-game interview, closing with "Hold it in babe, I'm coming." Taurasi then flew from Las Vegas, where the game took place, back to Phoenix, arriving in time to witness Taylor give birth to their daughter—Isla Taurasi-Taylor—on October 9, 2021, at 4:24 am; with Taurasi by her side mere hours after Taurasi played the Las Vegas Aces in Las Vegas for game five of the 2021 WNBA Semifinals.

== WNBA career statistics ==
Legend
GP	Games played	GS	Games started	MPG	Minutes per game	RPG	Rebounds per game
APG	Assists per game	SPG	Steals per game	BPG	Blocks per game	PPG	Points per game
TO	Turnovers per game	FG%	Field-goal percentage	3P%	3-point field-goal percentage	FT%	Free-throw percentage
**Bold**	Career best	°	League leader

†	Denotes seasons in which Taylor won a WNBA championship

=== WNBA regular season ===
Year	Team	GP	GS	MPG	FG%	3P%	FT%	RPG	APG	SPG	BPG	TO	PPG
2001	Cleveland	32	0	17.5	.382	.301	.783	3.5	1.4	1.0	0.3	1.1	7.2
2002	Cleveland	30	26	30.3	.416	.342	.853	5.3	2.3	1.2	0.3	1.9	13.0
2003	Cleveland	**34**	33	26.4	.421	.343	.821	4.4	2.4	1.1	0.2	1.7	11.7
2004	Phoenix	33	33	**32.6**	.484	.427	.861	4.8	2.5	1.5	0.4	2.4	13.2
2005	Phoenix	29	29	29.4	.464	.404	.864	4.1	3.2	1.3	0.3	2.6	13.2
2006	Phoenix	20	8	26.8	.445	.369	.864	5.7	2.6	1.4	0.4	1.4	13.9
2007^{†}	Phoenix	**34**	**34**	29.7	.499	.378	.884	**6.3**	2.9	1.5	**0.6**	2.2	**17.8**
2009^{†}	Phoenix	14	1	20.2	.463	.400	.896	2.4	2.3	1.2	0.1	2.2	10.9
2010	Phoenix	32	32	30.0	.509	**.442**	.893	4.4	**5.0**	1.4	0.2	2.3	15.9
2011	Phoenix	29	29	29.8	**.511**	.402	.874	4.9	4.7	**1.6**	0.3	2.2	16.7
2013	Phoenix	10	3	16.1	.472	.421	**.963**	2.1	1.7	0.8	0.1	**0.6**	8.4
2014^{†}	Phoenix	33	24	23.4	.479	.357	.848	3.1	3.1	1.2	0.4	1.7	10.5
2016	Phoenix	25	25	25.7	.488	.396	.907	3.8	3.6	1.5	0.4	1.6	12.5
Career		355	277	26.8	.466	.382	.868	4.4	3.0	1.4	0.3	2.0	13.0

=== WNBA Postseason ===
Year	Team	GP	GS	MPG	FG%	3P%	FT%	RPG	APG	SPG	BPG	TO	PPG
2001	Cleveland	3	0	19.7	.320	.182	.750	3.0	1.0	**2.0**	0.3	1.6	7.0
2003	Cleveland	3	3	33.0	.444	.300	.833	4.3	1.0	**2.0**	0.3	2.0	15.0
2007^{†}	Phoenix	9	**9**	**34.6**	.464	.400	.912	**7.9**	3.8	1.7	1.1	2.7	**19.3**
2009^{†}	Phoenix	**11**	0	24.1	**.527**	.484	.863	3.5	3.4	0.3	0.1	**1.0**	14.3
2010	Phoenix	4	4	31.8	.474	**.556**	.882	4.8	**6.8**	**2.0**	0.5	2.2	14.0
2011	Phoenix	5	5	30.8	.478	.308	.833	5.2	3.0	0.8	0.2	1.8	11.6
2013	Phoenix	2	2	20.0	.500	.333	.500	2.0	4.0	1.0	0.0	**1.0**	6.0
2014^{†}	Phoenix	8	8	27.7	.492	.263	.903	5.1	4.9	1.7	0.3	1.1	11.4
2016	Phoenix	5	5	26.1	.368	.313	**.958**	4.4	3.0	1.6	**0.8**	1.8	11.2
Career		50	36	28.1	.466	.364	.887	4.9	3.6	1.4	0.5	1.7	13.4

== See also ==
- List of Australian WNBA players
