= Laëtitia Kamba =

French basketball player

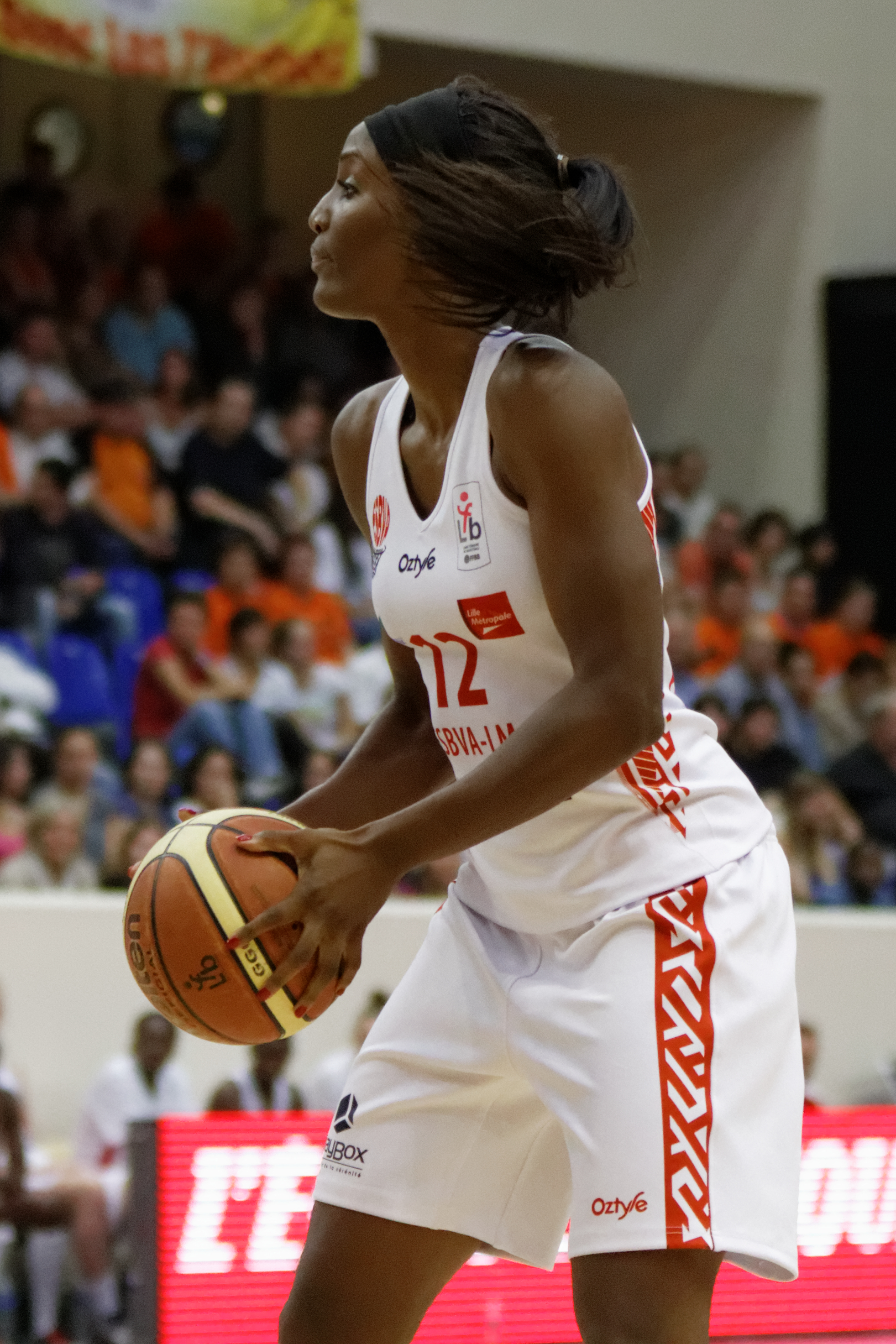
- Kamba in 2013

Cavigal Nice Basket
- Position: Forward
- League: LFB

Personal information
- Born: January 10, 1987 (age 39) Paris, France
- Listed height: 6 ft 2 in (1.88 m)

Laëtitia Kamba (born January 10, 1987) is a French basketball player who plays for club Cavigal Nice Basket of the Cavigal Nice Basket.
