= Sun Mengxin =

Chinese basketball player

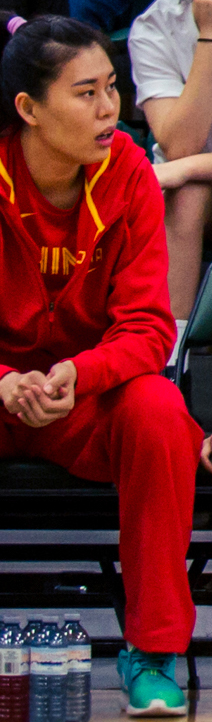
- Sun Mengxin in 2016

No. 13 – Bayi Kylin
- Position: Forward
- League: WCBA

Personal information
- Born: April 8, 1993 (age 33) Zibo, Shandong, China
- Listed height: 6 ft 3 in (1.91 m)

Career information
- Playing career: 2012–present

Career history
- 2012–present: Bayi Kylin

Sun Mengxin (Chinese: 孙梦昕; pinyin: Sūn Mèngxīn; born April 8, 1993) is a Chinese basketball player. She represented China in the basketball competition at the 2016 Summer Olympics.
