= Youth Arena =

Indoor arena in Rio de Janeiro

- Arena da Juventude
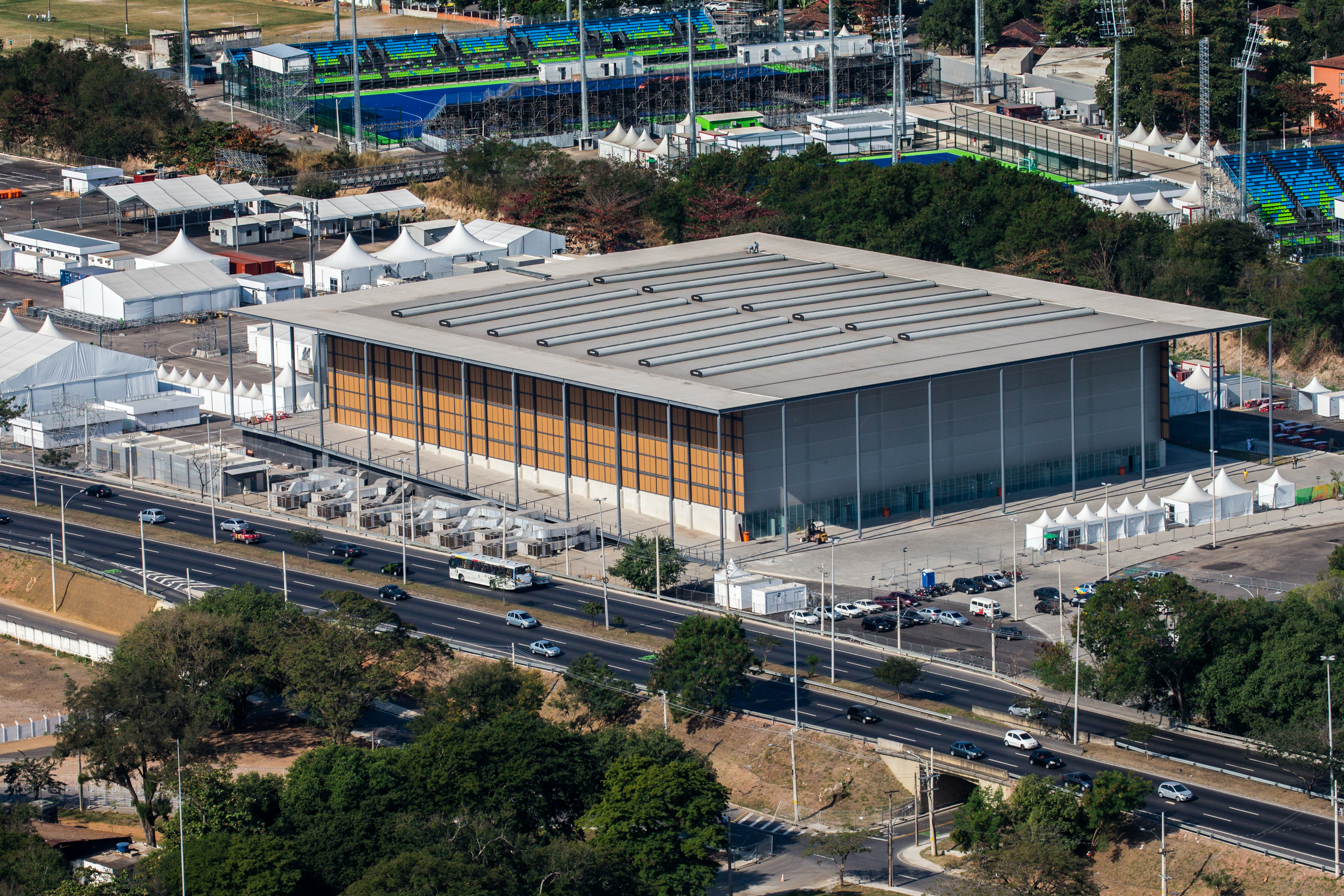
- Interactive map of Youth Arena
- Location: Deodoro, Rio de Janeiro, Brazil
- Coordinates: 22°51′34″S 43°24′15″W
- Capacity: 5,000 (2,000 permanent seats)

Construction
- Opened: 2016
- Architects: Vigliecca & Associados (Ronald Werner Fiedler, Héctor Vigliecca, Luciene Quel)

Tenants
- Basketball and Modern Pentathlon fencing events for the 2016 Summer Olympics

Youth Arena (Portuguese: Arena da Juventude) is an indoor arena in Deodoro, Rio de Janeiro, Brazil. The venue hosted the Basketball and Fencing events for the Modern Pentathlon at the 2016 Summer Olympics. The arena was also to host the wheelchair fencing events for the 2016 Summer Paralympics, but they were moved to Carioca Arena 3 due to budget cuts.

== Construction ==
The building was designed by the Brazilian architecture office Vigliecca & Associados. The project uses a sports hangar as its concept, being coherently elegant with the Olympic scale and presenting a great span of 66.5 meters, able to house several sport modalities. The building was designed to operate with only natural ventilation and illumination once in legacy mode. The adjustable shading devices and screens on the facade and exhaust openings on the roof as well as large shaded areas on the facade all contribute to a lowered maintenance cost. The artificial lighting and air conditioning are demanded by the Olympic Committee but will only be used during the Olympic Games.

== See also ==
- Deodoro Olympic Park
