= Shao Ting =

Chinese basketball player (born 1989)

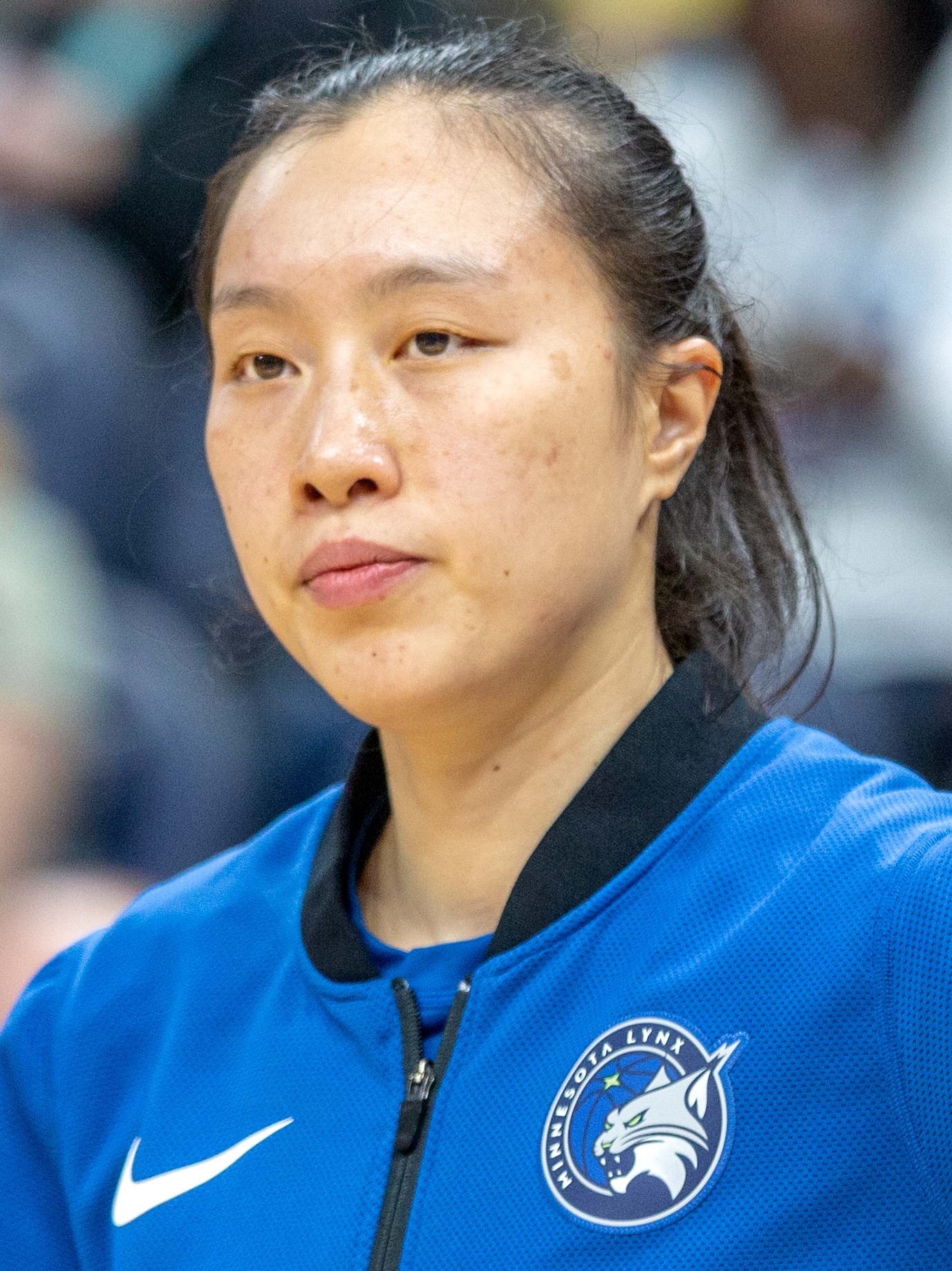
- Shao Ting in 2019

Personal information
- Born: 10 December 1989 (age 36) Shanghai, China
- Listed height: 6 ft 0 in (1.83 m)
- Listed weight: 165 lb (75 kg)

Career information
- College: Beijing Normal University
- WNBA draft: 2017: undrafted
- Playing career: 2013–present
- Position: Small forward

Career history
- 2013–2020: Beijing Great Wall
- 2019: Minnesota Lynx
- 2020–2021: Sichuan Yuanda
- Stats at Basketball Reference

Shao Ting (Chinese: 邵婷, born 10 December 1989) is a Chinese basketball player for the Sichuan Yuanda and the Chinese national team, where she participated at the 2014 FIBA World Championship. After playing in China, Ting was an undrafted free agent for the Lynx out of her country in 2017.

She is currently pursuing a Doctor of Philosophy degree in education at Beijing Normal University.

== WNBA career statistics ==
Legend
GP	Games played	GS	Games started	MPG	Minutes per game	RPG	Rebounds per game
APG	Assists per game	SPG	Steals per game	BPG	Blocks per game	PPG	Points per game
TO	Turnovers per game	FG%	Field-goal percentage	3P%	3-point field-goal percentage	FT%	Free-throw percentage
**Bold**	Career best	°	League leader

=== Regular season ===
Year	Team	GP	GS	MPG	FG%	3P%	FT%	RPG	APG	SPG	BPG	TO	PPG
2019	Minnesota	5	0	5.4	.200	.000	.667	1.2	0.4	0.0	0.2	0.4	1.2
Career	1 year, 1 team	5	0	5.4	.200	.000	.667	1.2	0.4	0.0	0.2	0.4	1.2
