= Lu Wen =

Chinese basketball player

No. 10 – Bayi Kylin
- Position: Small forward
- League: WCBA

Personal information
- Born: February 26, 1990 (age 36) Ordos City, Inner Mongolia, China
- Listed height: 6 ft 2 in (1.88 m)

Career information
- Playing career: 2007–present

Career history
- 2007–present: Bayi Kylin

Lu Wen (Chinese: 露雯, born February 26, 1990) is a Chinese basketball player for Bayi Kylin and the Chinese national team, where she participated at the 2014 FIBA World Championship.
