= Huang Hongpin =

Chinese basketball player

Shanxi Flame
- Position: Center
- League: WCBA

Personal information
- Born: April 23, 1989 (age 37)
- Listed height: 6 ft 5 in (1.96 m)
Medals
Women's basketball
Representing China
FIBA Asia Cup
Bronze medal – third place	2017 India
East Asian Games
Gold medal – first place	2009 Hong Kong

Huang Hongpin (Chinese: 黄红玭, born April 23, 1989) is a Chinese basketball player for Shanxi Flame and the Chinese national team, where she participated at the 2014 FIBA World Championship.
