= Zhao Zhifang =

Chinese basketball player

Zhao Zhifang 赵志芳
Tianjin University of Finance and Economics
- Position: Point guard
- League: WCBA

Personal information
- Born: August 11, 1994 (age 31) Langfang, Hebei, China
- Listed height: 5 ft 6 in (1.68 m)

Zhao Zhifang (simplified Chinese: 赵志芳; traditional Chinese: 趙誌芳; pinyin: zhào zhì fāng, born August 11, 1994, in Langfang, Hebei) is a Chinese female professional basketball player. She represented China in the women's basketball competition at the 2016 Summer Olympics.
