= Sarah Michel =

French basketball player

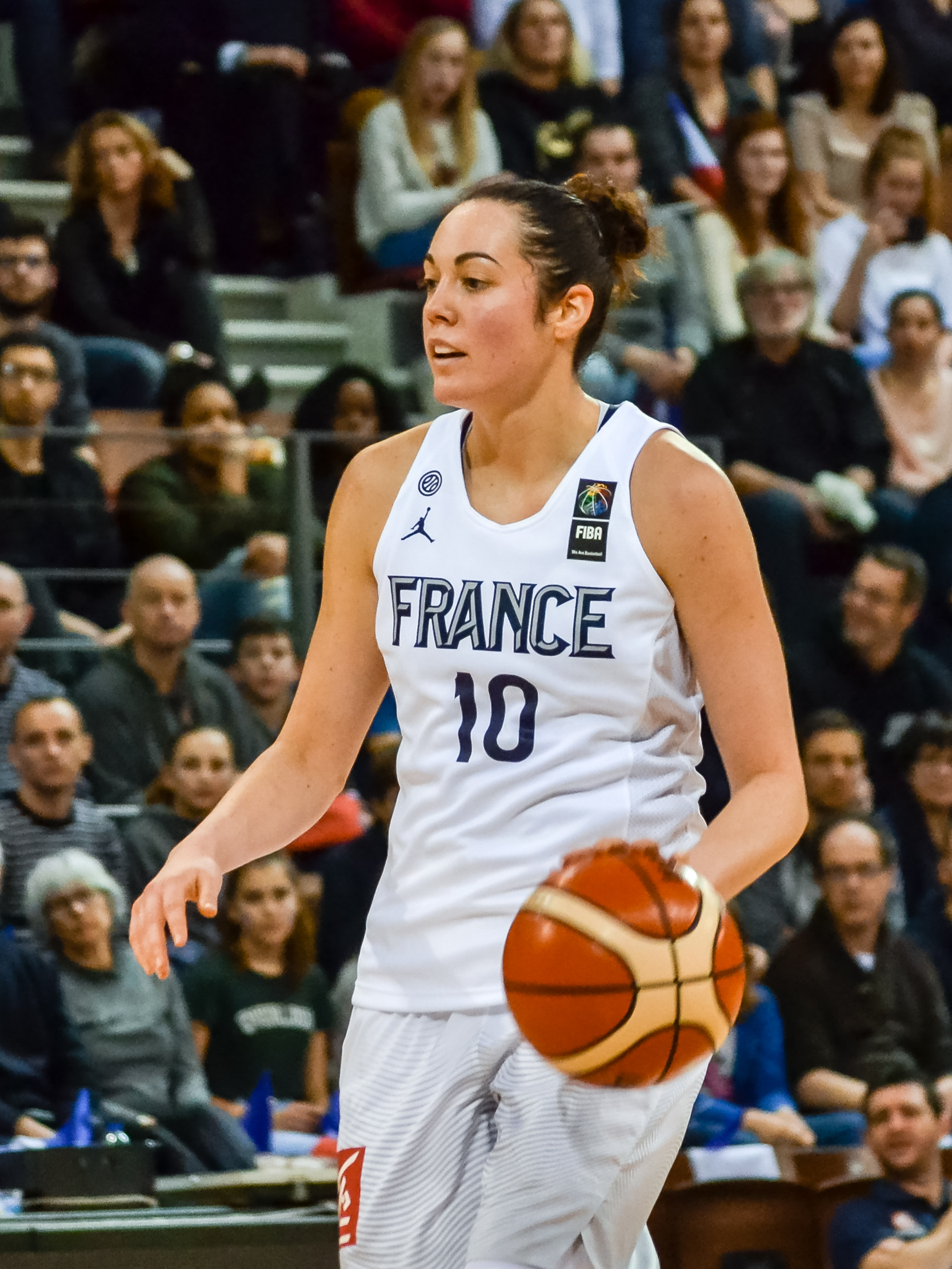
- Michel in 2018

No. 17 – Bourges Basket
- Position: Shooting guard
- League: LFB

Personal information
- Born: 10 January 1989 (age 37) Ris-Orangis, France
- Listed height: 5 ft 11 in (1.80 m)
- Listed weight: 159 lb (72 kg)

Career information
- WNBA draft: 2011: undrafted
Medals
Women's basketball
Representing (France) France
Olympic Games
Silver medal – second place	2024 Paris	Team
Bronze medal – third place	2020 Tokyo	Team
EuroBasket
Silver medal – second place	2015 Hungary/Romania
Silver medal – second place	2017 Czech Republic
Silver medal – second place	2021 Spain/France
Bronze medal – third place	2023 Israel/Slovenia

Sarah Michel (born 10 January 1989) is a French basketball player for CJM Bourges Basket and the French national team, where she participated at the 2016 Summer Olympics.
