= Sun Mengran =

Chinese basketball player

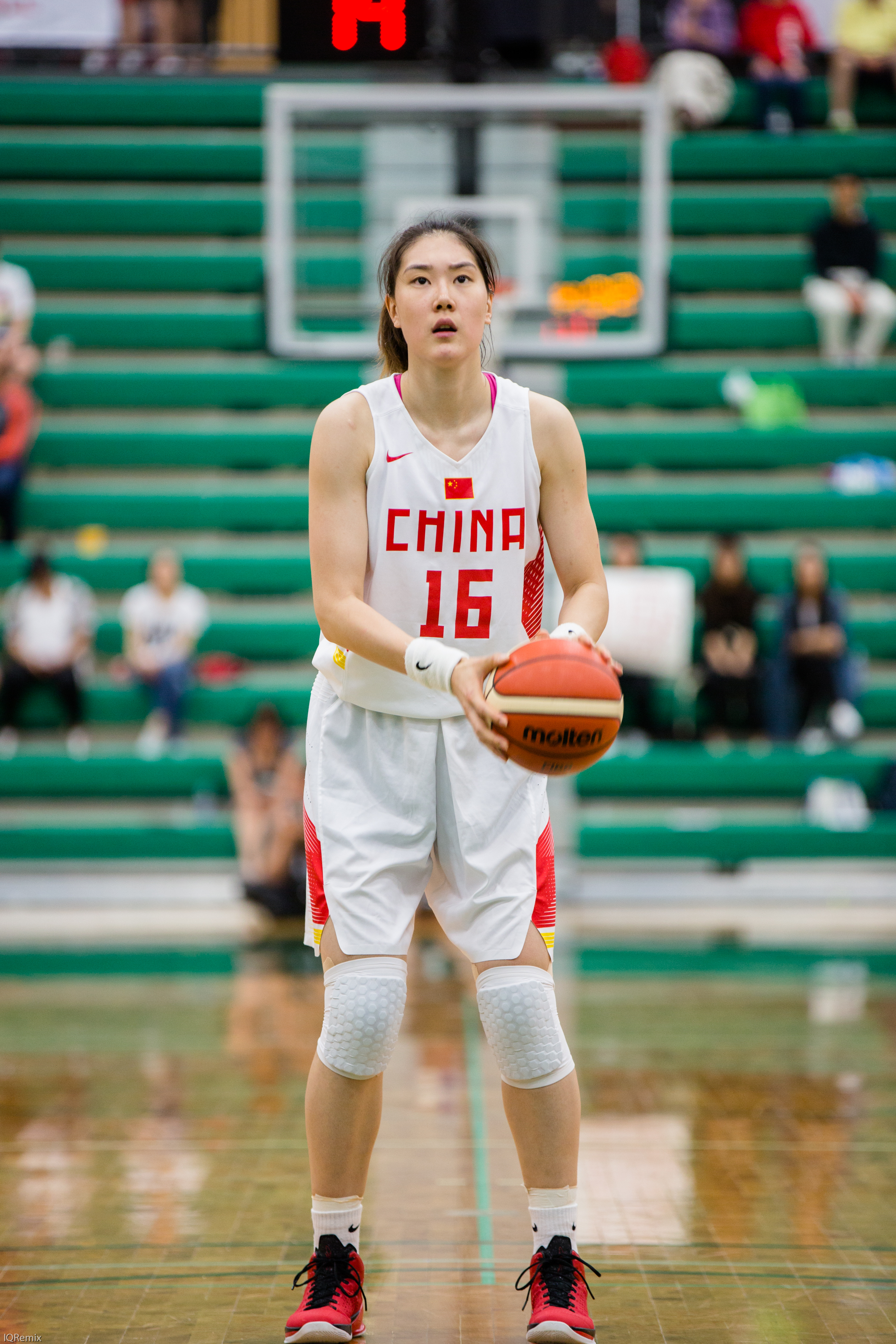

No. 21 – Inner Mongolia Rural Credit Union
- Position: Center
- League: WCBA

Personal information
- Born: 16 July 1992 (age 34) Tianjin, China
- Listed height: 6 ft 6 in (1.98 m)
- Listed weight: 183 lb (83 kg)

Career information
- WNBA draft: 2014: undrafted
- Playing career: 2009–present

Career history
- 2011–2020: Bayi Kylin
- 2021–2023: Sichuan Yuanda
- 2023–2025: Inner Mongolia Rural Credit Union

Sun Mengran (Chinese: 孙梦然, born 16 July 1992) is a Chinese basketball player for Inner Mongolia Rural Credit Union and the Chinese national team, where she participated at the 2014 FIBA World Championship and the 2024 Olympic Games.
