= Chen Xiaojia (basketball) =

Chinese basketball player

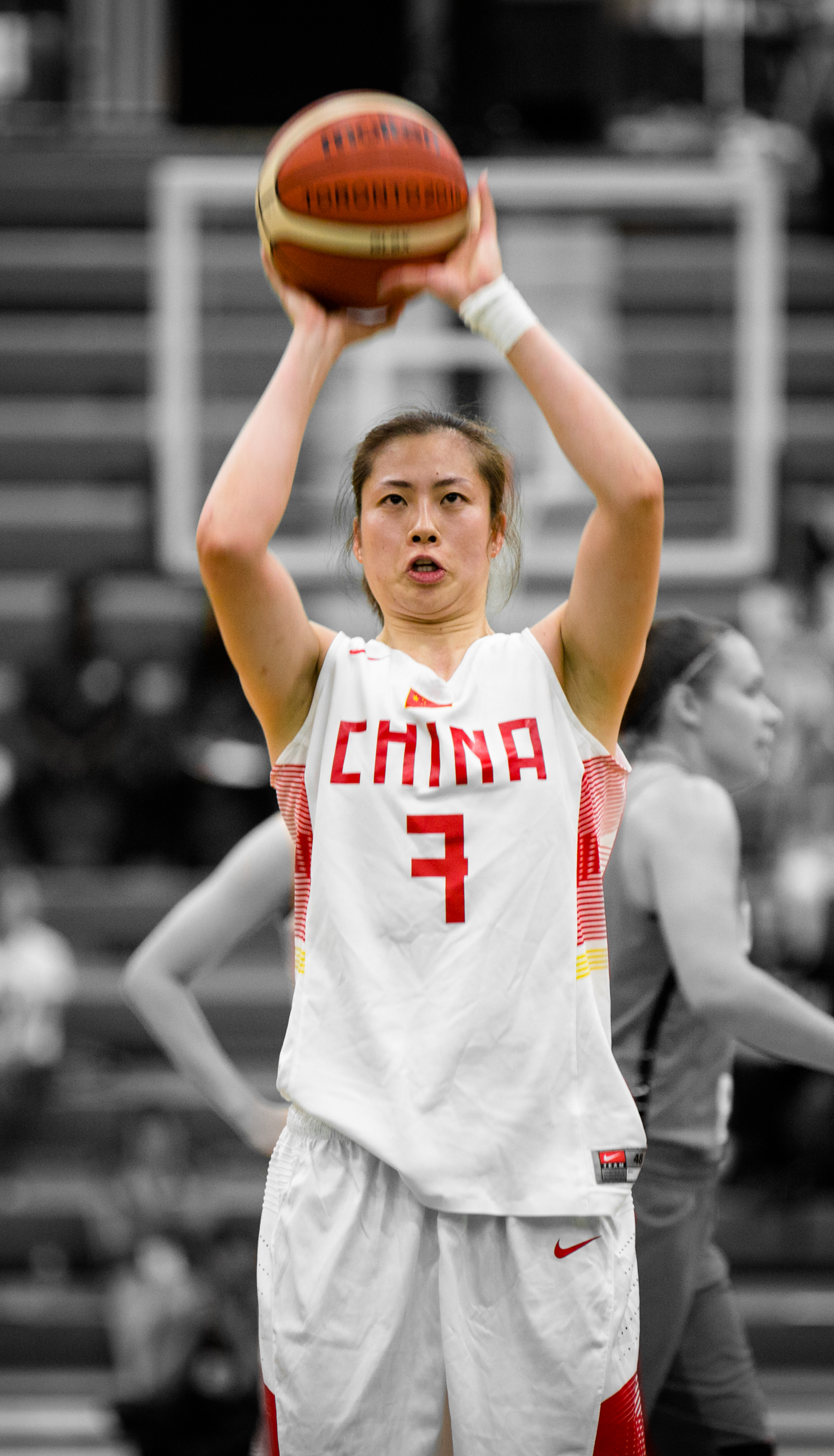

Jiangsu Phoenix
- Position: Guard
- League: WCBA

Personal information
- Born: April 2, 1988 (age 38)
- Listed height: 6 ft 0 in (1.83 m)
Medals
Women's basketball
Representing China
FIBA Asia Cup
Bronze medal – third place	2017 India
East Asian Games
Gold medal – first place	2009 Hong Kong

Chen Xiaojia (Chinese: 陈晓佳, born 2 April 1988) is a Chinese basketball player for Jiangsu Phoenix and the Chinese national team, where she participated at the 2014 FIBA World Championship.
