= Czech name =

Czech names are composed of a given name and a family name (surname). Czechs typically get one given name – additional names may be chosen by themselves upon baptism but they generally use one. With marriage, the bride typically adopts the bridegroom's surname.

== Given names ==
In the Czech Republic, names are simply known as jména ("names") or, if the context requires it, křestní jména ("baptismal names"). The singular form is jméno. A native Czech given name may have Christian roots or traditional Slavic pre-Christian origin (e.g. Milena, Božena, Jaroslav, Václav, Vojtěch).

It used to be a legal obligation for parents to choose their child's name from a list that was pre-approved by the government. Special permission was necessary for other names with exceptions for minorities and foreigners. Since the Velvet revolution in 1989, parents have had the right to give their child any name they wish, provided it is used somewhere in the world and is not insulting or demeaning. However, in recent years the common practice has been that most birth-record offices look for the name in the book Jak se bude vaše dítě jmenovat? (What is your child going to be called?), which is a semi-official list of "allowed" names. If the name is not found there, authorities are unwilling to register the child's name without a professional opinion (odborné stanovisko) from the Czech Language Institute (Ústav pro jazyk český).

=== Popularity ===
The most popular boys' names between 1999 and 2007 were Jan (John), Jakub (Jacob or James), Tomáš (Thomas) and Martin. Among the most popular girls' names were Tereza (Theresa), Kateřina (Katherine), Eliška (Elise), Natálie and Adéla. In 2016, Jakub, Jan, Tomáš, Filip and Eliška, Tereza, Anna, Adéla were the most popular names.

=== Grammar ===
Names, like all nouns in Czech language, are declined depending on their grammatical case. For example, one would say Pavel kouše sendvič ("Paul bites a sandwich"), but Pes kouše Pavla ("A dog bites Paul") and Pes ukousl Pavlovi prst ("The dog bit Pavel's finger off"; literally "The dog bit a finger off for Pavel"(dative case); "Pavel's finger" (possessive) would be "Pavlův prst"). Unlike the closely related Slovak language, Czech has a vocative case used when calling or addressing someone. For instance, one would say, Pavle, pozor pes! (Pavel, watch out for the dog!).

== Surnames ==
While Czechs share relatively few given names—roughly 260 names have a frequency above 500 in the Czech Republic—there are tens of thousands of Czech surnames (singular and plural: příjmení). These are similar in origin to English ones and may reflect:

- a personal characteristic of someone's ancestor (such as Malý – "small", Veselý – "cheerful", Železný – "iron")
- occupation (Kovář – "blacksmith", Kolář – "wheeler", Sedlák – "landowning farmer", Kočí – "coachman")
- the first name of a relative (Marek – "Mark", David, Eliáš – "Elias")
- animals (Liška – "fox", Zajíc – "hare", Jelínek – "little deer", Ježek – "hedgehog", Kocourek – "little tomcat")
  - especially birds are very common (Sokol – "falcon", Čermák – "black redstart", Kalous – "owl", Sýkora – "titmouse", Holub – "pigeon", Čáp – "stork", including foreign species like Sup - "vulture" and Papoušek - "parrot")
- plants (Konvalinka – "lily of the valley", Růžička – "little rose", Fiala – "violet", Javůrek – "young maple")
  - especially fruits and vegetables (Jahoda – "strawberry", Hruška – "pear", Cibulka – "little onion")
- food (Oliva – "olive", Makovec – "poppy cake", Slanina – "bacon")
- places of origin (Slezák – "Silesian", Moravec – "Moravian", Němec – "German", Hanák - from the region of "Haná")
  - also in a form of adjectives (Rosický – "of Rosice", Nepomucký – "of Nepomuk")
- actions, usually in past simple (there are hundreds of these surnames, e. g. Musil – "(he) had to", Pospíšil – "(he) hurried up", Zdražil – "(he) raised the price", Hrabal – "(he) raked")
- things (Procházka – "stroll", Chalupa – "cottage", Svačina – "snack", Kučera – "a curl of hair")

Some Czech surnames have a descriptive, colorful nature, such as Brzobohatý (soon to be rich), Volopich (pricking an ox), Urvinitka (tear a string), Rádsetoulal (liked wandering around), Stojaspal (slept standing), Vítámvás (I welcome you), Tenkrát (back in those days), Schovajsa (hide yourself!), Nebojsa (fearless man), Skočdopole (jump in a field!), Vozihnoj (transport the manure), Osolsobě (salt for yourself!), Ventluka (knocking outward), Nejezchleba (don't eat bread!), Potměšil (taunting man), Přecechtěl (he wanted anyway), Drahokoupil (he bought costly), Nepovím (I'm not going to tell). Similar surnames exist in Ukrainian, e.g., Perebiynis, literally "break the nose", Skorobogatko from the nickname "soon to be rich" and in Russian: Skorobogatov, from "soon to be rich".

German surnames are also quite common in the Czech Republic; the country was part of the Austrian Empire before 1918 and had a large German population until World War II. Some of them got phonetically normalized and transcribed to Czech: Müller (miller) as well as Miler; Stein (Stone) as well as Štajn, Schmied (Smith) as well as Šmíd (or Šmýd), Fritsch (Frič), Schlessinger (Šlesingr), etc. Some of them retain their original German surnames e. g. : Gottwald, Feiersinger, Dienstbier, Berger, Koller, Klaus, Franz, Forman, Ebermann, Lendl, Ulihrach, Gebauer, Kaberle, Vogelstanz, Geier, etc. Other ethnic minorities that have been living in Czechia for centuries have retained their original or transcribed names - Croatian (Košulič), Polish (Folwarczny → Folvarčný), French (Lebloch, Chalet → Šalé), Romanian (Colceag → Kolčák), etc.

Many of Czech surnames occur in a diminutive form which was used to distinguish father and son (similar to John → Johnnie), as a patronymic (John → Johnson), or a taller and shorter persons. Almost any surname can have its diminutive version. Examples include Petr → Peterka or Petřík → Petříček, Václav → Václavek or Václavík or Vašek → Vašinka, Sedlák → Sedláček, Polák → Poláček, Novák → Nováček, Zajíc → Zajíček, Němec → Němeček, Kalous → Kalousek, Havel → Havlík → Havlíček, Štěpán → Štěpánek → Štěpnička, Kovář → Kovařík → Kovaříček, Holub → Holoubek, Kocour → Kocourek, Cibula → Cibulka, Petržela → Petrželka, Chalupa → Chaloupka, Čáp → Čapek, Beran → Beránek, Šnajdr → Šnejdárek, Doležal → Doležálek.

The most common Czech surnames are Novák ("Newman"), Svoboda ("Freeman," literally "Freedom"), Novotný (same origin as Novák), Dvořák (from dvůr, "freehold farm") and Černý ("Black").

=== Female surnames ===
As in English-speaking countries, Czech women traditionally receive their father's surname at birth and take their husband's name when they marry. However, the names are not exactly the same; the endings differ to fit into the Czech language's systems of gender adjectives. For example, the tennis players Cyril Suk and Helena Suková are brother and sister; Suková is the feminine form of Suk. In fact, Czech female surnames are almost always feminine adjectives. There are several ways of forming them, depending on their male counterpart:

- If the male surname is a masculine adjective (ending in -ý), the female surname is simply the feminine equivalent. Thus, a girl whose father's surname is Novotný would have the surname Novotná .
- If the male surname is a noun, the female surname takes the suffix -ová, making it a feminine adjective:
  - Novák becomes Nováková
  - Horáček becomes Horáčková
  - Svoboda becomes Svobodová
  - Navrátil (in the literal meaning of "he returned") becomes Navrátilová, i.e. not Navrátila ("she returned")

A few Czech surnames do not differ for men and women in the nominative case (the case used for the subject of a sentence). Those include surnames whose male form is genitive plural, (e.g. Jirků, Janků) and those whose male form is an adjective with the suffix -í (e.g. Tachecí, Jarní). These are only identical in two of the seven grammatical cases; in the other five, the male and female forms differ, as per the soft adjective declension.

A feminine surname is also the same as masculine if it is of foreign origin and adding the suffix -ová would be awkward or unfeasible: Olga Walló, Blanka Matragi.

Until 2004, every woman who married in the Czech Republic and wanted to change her name had to adopt a feminine surname, unless her husband was a foreigner whose name ended in a vowel or she was a registered member of a Czech minority group. A law passed in 2004 allows all foreign women, and Czech women who marry foreign men, to adopt their husband's exact surname.

An amendment proposed to allow women to use male family name versions was approved by the Senate of the Czech Republic in July 2021.

As in English-speaking countries, some Czech women decide to keep their maiden name after marriage or adopt a double surname. A couple can also agree to both adopt the woman's surname, with the husband using the masculine form.

It is common practice in Czech press to inflect the gender of foreign women surnames by adding the -ová feminine suffix to allow for their proper declension, e.g. Michelle Obama is referred to as Michelle Obamová in the Czech press, or science fiction writer Ursula Le Guin appears in Czech translations as Ursula Le Guinová. This is not done for Czech women with masculine surnames though, as the press tends to respect the official name in such cases. Critics of this practice claim that adding a Czech female suffix to a foreign surname means deliberately changing a woman's name and is therefore both misleading and inconsiderate. However, the Institute of the Czech Language defends this practice, arguing that the Czech declension of foreign men's surnames changes the name in a comparable way and points out that other languages modify Czech names as well, usually through the removal of diacritics.

== Surnames in the plural ==
Surnames that are nouns in the masculine singular:

- Novákovi - the Nováks
- rodina Novákova - the Novák family
- bratři Novákovi - the brothers Novák
- sestry Novákovy - the sisters Novák

All forms of the surname Novák are possessive adjectives in the plural; their endings depend on the gender and case.

Surnames that are adjectives in the masculine singular:

- Novotní - the Novotnýs
- rodina Novotných - the Novotný family
- bratři Novotní - the brothers Novotný
- sestry Novotné - the sisters Novotný

All forms of the surname Novotný are adjectives in the plural; their endings depend on the gender and case. The form Novotných is in the genitive case.

== See also ==
- Czech declension
- Czech orthography
- Czech language
- Czech name days
- Slovak name
- Slavic names
- Slavic surnames
