= Kovář =

Kovář (Czech pronunciation: [ˈkovaːr̝̊]; feminine: Kovářová) is a Czech surname, meaning 'smith'. Notable people with the surname include:

- Daniela Kovářová (born 1964), Czech politician
- Dennis G. Kovar, American physicist
- František Kovář (1888–1969), Czech Hussite bishop
- Jakub Kovář (born 1988), Czech ice hockey player
- Jan Kovář (born 1990), Czech ice hockey player
- Jaroslav Kovář (1934–2015), Czech athlete
- Jiří Kovář (born 1989), Italian volleyball player of Czech origin
- Karel Kovář (rower) (born 1942), Czech rower
- Karel Kovář, known as Kovy (born 1996), Czech youtuber
- Lukáš Kovář (born 1992), Czech ice hockey player
- Marie Kovářová (1927–2023), Czech gymnast
- Mary Grace Kovar (1929–2015), American biostatistician
- Matěj Kovář (born 2000), Czech footballer
- Michal Kovář (born 1973), Czech footballer
- Přemysl Kovář (born 1985), Czech footballer
- Robin Kovář (born 1984), Czech ice hockey player
- Sára Kovářová (born 1999), Czech handballer
- Zdeněk Kovář (1917–2004), Czech designer
