= Chalupa (disambiguation) =

A chalupa is a tostada-like dish in Mexican cuisine.

Chalupa may also refer to:

- Chalupa (boat)
- Chalupa (surname)
- Chałupa, a settlement in Pomeranian Voivodeship, Poland
