= Chalupa (surname) =

Chalupa (Czech pronunciation: [ˈxalupa]; feminine: Chalupová) is a Czech and Slovak surname, meaning 'cottage', 'rural house'. It originated as a designation for the owner of such a building. Chałupa is a Polish surname with the same origin. Notable people with the surname include:

- Alexandra Chalupa (born 1976 or 1977), American political activist
- František Chalupa (1828–1887), Czech painter and illustrator
- Jarmila Chalupová (1903–1988), Czech fencer
- Leo M. Chalupa (born 1945), Ukrainian-American physiologist
- LeRoy Wilfred Chalupa (1912–1965), American politician
- Lukáš Chalupa (born 1993), Czech ice hockey player
- Milan Chalupa (born 1953), Czech ice hockey player
- Tomáš Chalupa (born 1974), Czech politician
- Václav Chalupa (born 1967), Czech rower
- Václav Chalupa Sr. (born 1934), Czech rower
- Zuzana Chalupová (1925–2001), Serbian-Slovak naïve painter

== See also ==
- Chaloupka, Czech surname, diminutive of Chalupa
- Chalupka, Slovak surname, diminutive of Chalupa
