= Stepankova =

- Feminine counterpart of the Russian-language surname Stepankov
- Štěpánková, Feminine counterpart of the Czech-language surname Štěpánek
