= Čapek =

Čapek (feminine: Čapková; Czech pronunciation: [ˈtʃapɛk]) is a Czech surname. It originated as a diminutive of the surname Čáp, literally meaning 'little stork'. Notable people with the surname include:

- František Čapek (1914–2008), Czech canoeist
- Irene Capek (1924–2006), Czech-born Australian politician and Holocaust survivor
- Jan Čapek of Sány (died after 1445), Czech noble and military leader
- John Capek (born 1947), Czech-born Australian-Canadian songwriter
- Josef Čapek (1887–1945), Czech painter and writer
- Josef Čapek (footballer) (1902–1983), Czech footballer
- Karel Čapek (1890–1938), Czech journalist, writer and playwright
- Karel Matěj Čapek-Chod (1860–1927), Czech writer
- Kateřina Čapková (born 1973), Czech historian
- Milič Čapek (1909–1997), Czech-American philosopher
- Norbert Čapek (1870–1942) founder of the Unitarian Church in what became Czechoslovakia
- Tereza Čapková (born 1987), Czech athlete

== See also ==
- 1931 Čapek
- Brothers Čapek
- Czapek, alternative spelling
