= Czapek =

Czapek may refer to:

== People ==
- Elisabeth Czapek (1860–1949), Swedish miniature painter
- Franciszek Czapek (1811–1895), Polish watchmaker, founder of Czapek & Cie
- Friedrich Czapek (1868–1921), Czech botanist who developed Czapek medium
- Leopold Eustachius Czapek (1792–1840), Czech-Austrian pianist and composer

== Other uses ==
- Czapek & Cie, a watch company
- Czapek medium, a medium for growing fungi in a lab

== See also ==
- Čapek, a surname
