= Rosický =

Rosický is a Czech surname that may refer to:

- Evžen Rošický (1914–1942), Czech athlete and journalist
- Jaroslav Rošický (1884–1942), Czech army officer
- Jiří Rosický (disambiguation)
- Tomáš Rosický (born 1980), Czech football player

== See also ==
- Neighbour Rosicky, a short story by Willa Cather
