= Papoušek =

Papoušek (feminine Papoušková) is a Czech surname meaning "parrot". Notable people with the surname include:

- Jaroslav Papoušek (1920–1996), Czech film director and screenwriter
- Jaroslav Papoušek (historian) (1890–1945), Czech diplomat, historian, archivist, and publicist
- Kamil Papoušek
- Naděžda Melniková-Papoušková (1891–1978), Czechoslovak cultural historian, folklorist, and translator
- Petr Papoušek (born 1977), Czech footballer
