= Jacob Ari Labendz =

21st-century scholar of Jewish history and culture

Jacob Ari Labendz is a scholar of Jewish history and culture. His doctoral dissertation under the supervision of Hillel J. Kieval was titled "Jews and the State in Communist Central Europe: the Czech Lands, 1945–1989". From 2017 to 2022, he was employed as the director of the Center for Judaic and Holocaust Studies at Youngstown State University, also teaching history courses as an assistant professor. In 2021, his contract was not renewed, sparking protests from students, faculty, and other supporters, who collected 900 signatures on a petition against the cancelling of the contract. In 2022, he was hired as director of the Gross Center for Holocaust and Genocide Studies at Ramapo College of New Jersey.

== Works ==
- Labendz, Jacob Ari, ed. (2018). Jewish Property After 1945: Cultures and Economies of Ownership, Loss, Recovery, and Transfer. Routledge. ISBN 978-1-351-39384-3.]
- Labendz, Jacob Ari; Yanklowitz, Shmuly (2019). Jewish Veganism and Vegetarianism: Studies and New Directions. SUNY Press. ISBN 978-1-4384-7361-1.
