= Zajic =

Zajic may refer to:

- Zajíc, Czech surname
- Zajić, Serbian surname (Зајић)
- 10626 Zajíc, minor planet

== See also ==
- Dolora Zajick (born 1952), American opera singer
