= Zajíček =

Zajíček (feminine: Zajíčková) is a Czech surname. It is a diminutive of the Czech word zajíc (meaning 'hare') and the name Zajíc. Notable people with the surname include:

- Adam Zajíček (born 1993), Czech volleyball player
- Carl Wenzel Zajicek (1860–1923), Austrian painter
- Jan Zajíček (born 1977), Czech film director
- Jan Zajíček (ice hockey) (born 1951), Czech ice hockey player
- Jaroslav Zajíček (1920–2002), Czech cross-country skier
- Lubomír Zajíček (1946–2013), Czech volleyball player
- Pavel Zajíček (born 1951), Czech poet
- Phil Zajicek (born 1979), American road cyclist
- Šimon Zajíček (born 2001), Czech ice hockey player
