= Čáp =

Čáp (feminine: Čápová) is a Czech surname, literally meaning 'stork'. Notable people with the surname include:

- František Čáp (1913–1972), Czech film director and screenwriter
- Tomáš Čáp (born 1978), Czech footballer
- Vladimír Čáp (born 1976), Czech footballer
- Vladislav Čáp (1926–2001), Czech figure skater
- Zdeněk Čáp (born 1992), Czech ice hockey player

== See also ==
- Sylvia Čápová-Vizváry (born 1947), Slovak pianist
