= Chaloupka =

Chaloupka (feminine: Chaloupková) is a Czech surname. It is a diminutive of the word chalupa ('cottage') and the surname Chalupa. Notable people with the surname include:

- Eva Chaloupková (1905–?), Czech swimmer
- Frank Chaloupka (born c. 1962), American health economist
- George Chaloupka (1932–2011), Czech-born Australian art historian and anthropologist
- Pavel Chaloupka (1959–2025), Czech footballer
- Petr Chaloupka (born 1985), Czech ice hockey player
- Václav Chaloupka (born 1998), Czech slalom canoeist

== See also ==
- Chalupka, Slovak surname
- Martin Chaloupka's astronomical clock
