= Pospíšil =

Pospíšil (feminine Pospíšilová) is a Czech surname. Notable people with the surname include:

- Alžběta "Eliška" Pospíšilová (1900–1994)
- Antonín Pospíšil (1903–1973), Czechoslovak politician
- Christian Pospischil (born 1985), German football player
- Craig Pospisil American playwright
- David Pospíšil (born 1970), Czech ice hockey player
- Dorota Pospíšilová (born 1930), Slovak viticulturist
- František Pospíšil (born 1944), Czech ice hockey player
- Jana Pospíšilová (born 1970), Czech tennis player
- Jaroslav Pospíšil (born 1981), Czech tennis player
- Jaroslav Pospíšil (canoeist), Czech canoeist
- Jiří Pospíšil (born 1975), Czech politician
- John Pospisil, American sound editor
- Josef Pospíšil (born 1953), Czech skier
- Kristián Pospíšil (born 1996), Slovak ice hockey player
- Martin Pospíšil (footballer) (born 1991), Czech footballer
- Martin Pospíšil (ice hockey) (born 1999), Czech ice hockey player
- Michal Pospíšil (born 1979), Czech footballer
- Miroslav Pospíšil (1890–1964), Czech footballer
- Peter Pospíšil (1944–2006), Slovak handball player
- Robert Pospíšil (born 1977), Czech ice hockey player
- Tomáš Pospíšil (footballer) (born 1991), Czech association football player
- Tomáš Pospíšil (ice hockey) (born 1987), Czech ice hockey player
- Vasek Pospisil (born 1990), Canadian tennis player
- Věra Pospíšilová-Cechlová (born 1978), Czech track and field athlete
- Vlasta Pospíšilová (1935–2022), Czech animator and director of Fimfarum and Pat and Mat
- Victor J. Pospishil (1915–2006), Austrian-US Ukrainian Catholic priest
- Pospíšil brothers, Czech cycle ball champions
  - Jan Pospíšil
  - Jindřich Pospíšil
