= Jakub Jesionkowski =

Polish footballer

Personal information
- Full name: Jakub Jesionkowski
- Date of birth: 7 March 1989 (age 37)
- Place of birth: Poznań, Poland
- Height: 1.90 m (6 ft 3 in)
- Position: Goalkeeper

Youth career
- 2004–2005: Olimpia Poznań
- 2005–2006: MSP Szamotuły

Senior career*
Years	Team	Apps	(Gls)
2006–2008	Zagłębie Lubin	0	(0)
2008–2009	Zagłębie Lubin II	22	(0)
2009–2011	Swindon Town	0	(0)
2010–2011	→ Oxford City (loan)	10	(0)
Total		32	(0)

International career
- Poland U19
- * Club domestic league appearances and goals

Jakub Jesionkowki (born 7 March 1989) is a Polish former professional football player who played as a goalkeeper.

== Club career ==
=== Zagłębie Lubin ===
Jesionkowski began his footballing career as a teenager at his local football club, Olimpia Poznań but left to attend the MSP Szamotuły Football Academy, a football centre that specialises in goalkeeping.

After leaving MSP Szamotuły, Jesionkowski joined Ekstraklasa outfit Zagłębie Lubin in 2006. He got his first match experience as a late substitute for Michal Václavík in the 3–0 Ekstraklasa Cup victory over Górnik Zabrze in December 2006.

Jesionkowski failed to break into the first team side throughout the remainder of the 2006–07 season, but continued to play the occasional Ekstraklasa Cup game including the full 90 minutes of Lubin's second victory of the season over Górnik Zabrze. He also played the final 17 minutes of the quarter-final loss to Dyskobolia Grodzisk Wielkopolski, replacing Mariusz Liberda.

During the following 2007–08 season, Jesionkowski played mainly reserve or youth team football for the 'Miedziowi' and made his sole senior appearance in an Ekstraklasa Cup win over Lech Poznań on 4 December 2007, which ended in a 1–0 win following an injury time goal by Paweł Wasilewski.

He spent his final season playing for Zagłębie Lubin II in III liga. Jesionkowski was sent-off after only nine minutes against Wulkan/MKS Oława, but kept eight clean sheets during the 22 appearances he played throughout the campaign.

=== Swindon Town ===
On 31 July 2009, Jesionkowski left Zagłębie Lubin to sign a two-year deal with English League One outfit Swindon Town. His signature meant that Swindon would be employing four goalkeepers during the 2009–10 season alongside David Lucas, Phil Smith and youth graduate Mark Scott.

He was unable to find a way into Swindon's first team throughout his debut season. However, when Danny Wilson rested Lucas or if he was injured, Jesionkowski acted as cover on the substitutes bench for the league games at the County Ground against Colchester United, Oldham Athletic and Norwich City. Also, the away fixtures in League One at Southend United and Southampton and the cup games against Woking in the FA Cup and Norwich City in the Football League Trophy.

Jesionkowski did contribute towards Swindon Town's Wiltshire Premier Shield success during the 2009–10 campaign. He played in the semi-final first leg win over Salisbury City but was an unused substitute as Town beat fellow Swindon based club Swindon Supermarine 2–0 in the final.

== International career ==
Jesionkowski represented his native Poland at youth international level playing for the under-19s while playing for Zagłębie Lubin.

== Honours ==
Swindon Town

- Wiltshire Premier Shield: 2010
