= Václavík =

Václavík (Czech pronunciation: [ˈvaːt͡slaviːk]; Czech and Slovak feminine: Václavíková), less commonly Václavik, is a surname. Other spellings include Wacławik (Polish) and Watzlawik, Watzlawick, Wazlawik (Germanized).

== People ==
- Adam Václavík (born 1994), Czech biathlete
- Ivan Václavík (born 1971), Slovak footballer
- Jan Václavík (born 1985), Czech volleyball player
- Josef Václavík (1900–1973), Czech architect
- Lucie Václavíková (born 1967), Czech volleyball player
- Michal Václavík (born 1976), Czech footballer
- Milán Václavík (1928–2007), Slovak military officer
- Rastislav Václavik (born 1997), Slovak footballer
- Paul Watzlawick (1921–2007), American psychologist
- Ami Wazlawik (born 1980s), American politician

== See also ==
- Václavek
