= Zajíčkov =

- Municipality
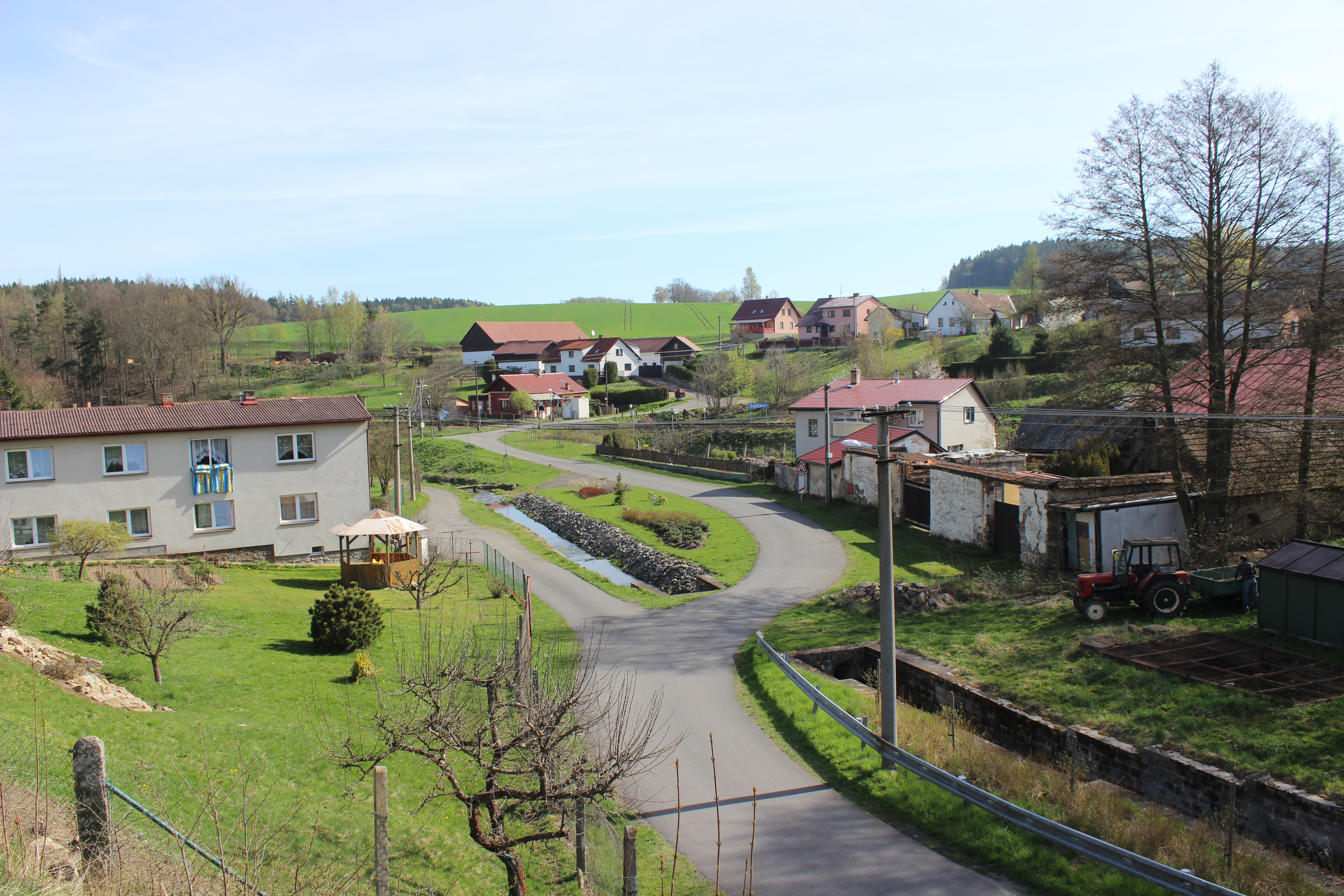
- Centre of Zajíčkov

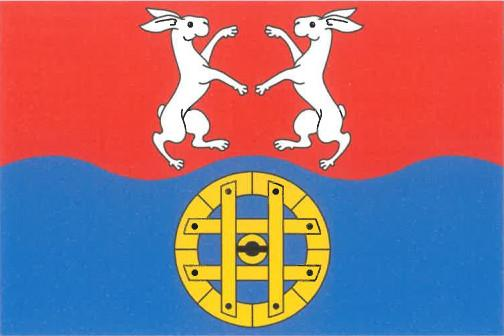
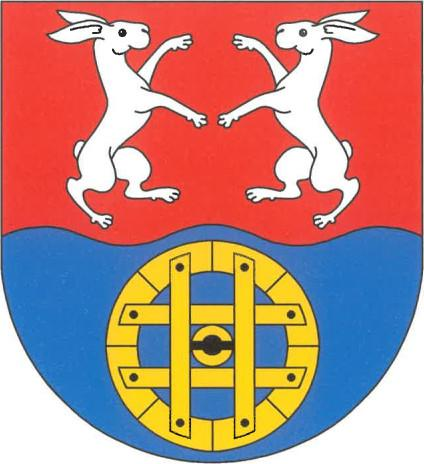
- Flag Coat of arms

- Location in the Czech Republic
- Coordinates: 49°22′41″N 15°15′29″E
- Country: Czech Republic
- Region: Vysočina
- District: Pelhřimov
- First mentioned: 1203

Area
  - Total: 4.54 km^{2} (1.75 sq mi)
- Elevation: 580 m (1,900 ft)

Population (2026-01-01)
  - Total: 228
  - Density: 50.2/km^{2} (130/sq mi)
- Time zone: UTC+1 (CET)
  - Summer (DST): UTC+2 (CEST)
- Postal code: 393 01
- Website: www.zajickov.cz

Zajíčkov is a municipality and village in Pelhřimov District in the Vysočina Region of the Czech Republic. It has about 200 inhabitants.

== Administrative division ==
Zajíčkov consists of two municipal parts (in brackets population according to the 2021 census):

- Zajíčkov (172)
- Rovná (44)

== Etymology ==
The name is derived from the personal name Zajíček, meaning "Zajíček's".

== Geography ==
Zajíčkov is located about 6 kilometres (4 mi) south of Pelhřimov and 23 km (14 mi) west of Jihlava. It lies in the Křemešník Highlands. The highest point is at 650 m (2,133 ft) above sea level. The Podlesník Stream flows through the municipality and supplies here a system of several small fishponds.

== History ==
The first written mention of Zajíčkov is from 1203.

== Demographics ==
Historical population

Year	Pop.	±%
1869	273	—
1880	268	−1.8%
1890	269	+0.4%
1900	274	+1.9%
1910	279	+1.8%

Year	Pop.	±%
1921	280	+0.4%
1930	248	−11.4%
1950	205	−17.3%
1961	212	+3.4%
1970	190	−10.4%

Year	Pop.	±%
1980	190	+0.0%
1991	190	+0.0%
2001	195	+2.6%
2011	221	+13.3%
2021	216	−2.3%

Source: Censuses

== Transport ==
Zajíčkov is located on the railway line Jihlava–Tábor.

== Sights ==
There are no protected cultural monuments in the municipality.
