= Eliáš =

Eliáš (feminine: Eliášová) is a Czech and Slovak given name and surname, a version of the name Elias. Notable people with the name include:

== Surname ==
- Alois Eliáš (1890–1942), Czech general and politician
- Barbora Markéta Eliášová (1874–1957), Czech writer, traveller and educator
- Patrik Eliáš (born 1976), Czech ice hockey player
- Pavel Eliáš (born 1986), Czech footballer
- Jaroslav Eliáš (1906–1962), Czech athlete

== Given name ==
- Eliáš Galajda (1931–2017), Slovak writer and translator

== See also ==
- Elias (disambiguation)
