= Kalousek =

Kalousek (feminine: Kalousková) is a Czech surname. It is a diminutive of the surname Kalous and the word kalous, meaning 'long-eared owl'. Notable people with the surname include:

- David Kalousek (born 1975), Czech footballer
- Josef Kalousek (1838–1915), Czech historian
- Miroslav Kalousek (born 1960), Czech politician
