= Konvalinka =

Konvalinka (feminine: Konvalinková) is a Czech language surname, literally meaning Convallaria flower (lily of the valley). The surname may refer to:

- Petr Konvalinka, rector of the Czech Technical University in Prague
- Kateřina Konvalinka Průšová, Czech female model
- Naďa Konvalinková, Czech actor
