= Kocurek =

Kocurek is a surname. It is a Polish diminutive of Kocur ("tomcat") and a cognate of the Czech surname Kocourek. Notable people with the surname include:

- Julie Kocurek (born 1964), American attorney and judge
- Kris Kocurek (born 1978), American football coach
