= Brzobohatý =

Brzobohatý (feminine: Brzobohatá) is a Czech surname, literally meaning 'soon to be rich'. Notable people with the surname include:

- Radoslav Brzobohatý (1932–2012), Czech actor
- Zuzana Brzobohatá (born 1962), Czech politician

== See also ==
- Taťána Kuchařová (born 1987), formerly Taťána Gregor Brzobohatá, Czech model and beauty queen
- Skorobogatov
- Skorobogatko
