= Youngstown State University =

Public university in Youngstown, Ohio, US

- Former names: Youngstown Association School (1908–1921); Youngstown Institute of Technology (1921–1928); Youngstown College (1928–1955); Youngstown University (1955–1967)
- Motto: Animus Liberatus (Latin)
- Motto in English: The Mind Freed
- Type: Public university
- Established: 1908; 118 years ago
- Parent institution: University System of Ohio
- Academic affiliations: Northeast Ohio Medical University; space-grant
- Endowment: $399.9 million (2025)
- President: Bill Johnson
- Provost: Jennifer Pintar
- Students: 11,076 (fall 2023)
- Undergraduates: 8,468 (fall 2023)
- Postgraduates: 2,608 (fall 2023)
- Location: Youngstown, Ohio, U.S. 41.1067°N 80.6503°W
- Campus: Urban, 160 acres (65 ha)
- Other campuses: Steubenville
- Colors: Cardinal and white
- Nickname: Penguins
- Sporting affiliations: NCAA Division I Horizon League; Missouri Valley Football Conference; Mid-American Conference; Conference USA
- Mascot: Pete the Penguin
- Website: www.ysu.edu

Youngstown State University (YSU or Youngstown State) is a public university in Youngstown, Ohio, United States. It was founded in 1908 and is the easternmost member of the University System of Ohio. The university is composed of six undergraduate colleges and a graduate college.

Youngstown State University has over 100 undergraduate degree programs and 50 graduate degree programs serving over 11,000 students in studies up to the doctoral level. The university operates a satellite campus in Steubenville, Ohio. Beyond its current student body, the university has more than 115,000 alumni.

Collectively known as the Penguins, Youngstown State's athletic teams compete in Division I of the National Collegiate Athletic Association. The university is a member of the Horizon League in all varsity sports, with the exception of football which competes in the Missouri Valley Football Conference, bowling which competes in Conference USA, and lacrosse which competes in the Mid-American Conference (MAC).

== History ==
The Youngstown branch of the YMCA had provided high school and vocational education since 1888. Youngstown State University traces its origins to 1908, when the YMCA introduced a commercial law course intended to meet local demand for college-level instruction. It expanded its offerings to include business and engineering and in 1916, the YMCA consolidated its educational activities under the Youngstown Association School. In 1921, the school became known as the Youngstown Institute of Technology, and within the decade the Ohio State Board of Education authorized the School of Law and School of Commerce and Finance the authority to confer bachelor's degrees. The school's teacher-preparation program developed into Youngstown College in 1927, the same year in which the College of Liberal Arts was established.

The YMCA constructed Jones Hall north of downtown Youngstown in 1931. By the mid-1930s, Youngstown College was incorporated as a separate entity from the YMCA. Howard Jones was appointed its first president and remained in the role until 1966. Governance of the college was fully transferred from the YMCA in 1944. The institution was rechartered as Youngstown University in 1955 and became a public university in 1967 as Youngstown State University. During this period, the university expanded its academic programs; Dana's Musical Institute became part of the college in 1941, the William Rayen School of Engineering was created in 1946, the School of Business Administration was created in 1948, and the School of Education was created in 1960.

Further development occurred after the university became a public institution in the late 1960s. The Graduate School and the College of Applied Science and Technology were created in 1968, and the College of Creative Arts and Communication was created in 1974. In 1972, Youngstown State University joined other universities in northeast Ohio in forming the Northeastern Universities College of Medicine. In 1991, the engineering technology departments were reorganized into the newly formed College of Engineering and Technology, while remaining departments from the former CAST became the College of Health and Human Services.

In August 2005, just before the start of the academic year, two of four campus unions were on strike. Following the conclusion of the strike, relations remained strained, with some faculty and staff calling for the resignation of YSU president David Sweet in May 2007. A major reorganization in 2007 placed science and mathematics departments within the Rayen College of Engineering and Technology and consolidated the humanities and social sciences within a separate academic college.

Following the February 2024 announcement that Eastern Gateway Community College was pausing enrollment, YSU announced that it was considering opening its first satellite campus in Steubenville, Ohio, to serve displaced students in the Ohio Valley. YSU acquired the former Eastern Gateway campus in November 2025 and began offering classes in 2026.

== Campuses ==
=== Main campus ===
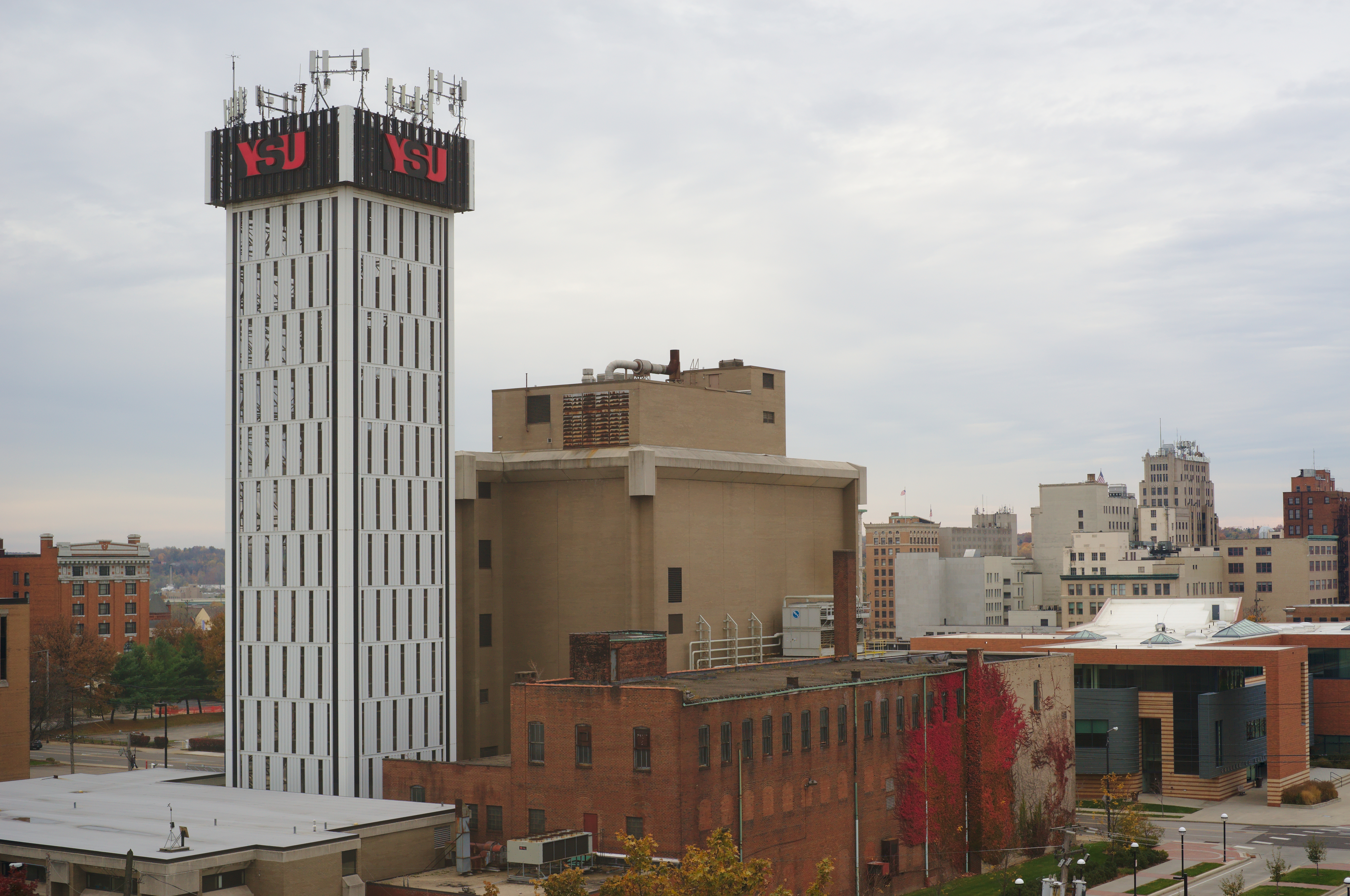
The YSU clock tower, a distinctive structure which also functions as a cell phone tower

YSU lies on a 160-acre (0.65 km^{2}) campus just north of downtown Youngstown. Kilcawley Center is the university's student center, located at the center of campus. It features reading rooms, computer labs, a copying center, a variety of restaurants and student affairs offices. Offices for many university student media outlets are housed here, including student newspaper The Jambar, student magazine The Yo, and student radio Rookery Radio. There are also many meeting and seminar rooms, which can be rented out for community events. Kilcawley Center is the main dining area for students and hosts eateries such as The Cove, KC Food Court, Dunkin', Jamba Juice, Pete's Treats, and Wendy's. Beginning in May of 2025, Kilcawley Center is under renovation to modernize and expand the student center. The center is expected to be complete and reopened in late 2027.

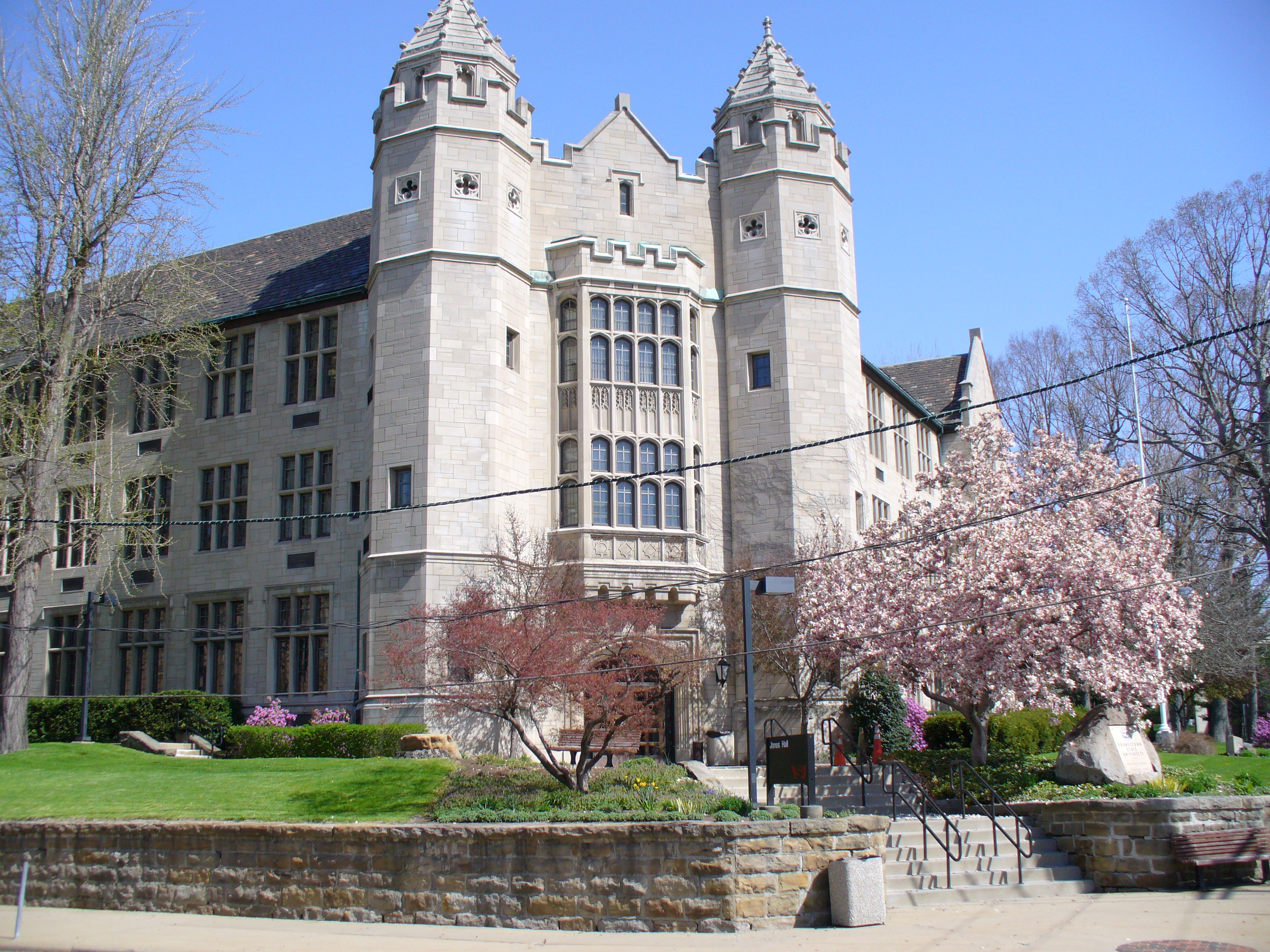
Jones Hall

Jones Hall, often the building that welcomes those coming onto YSU's campus, was built in 1931 and is one of the campus's oldest buildings. The building was renamed Jones Hall in honor of the institution's first president, Dr. Howard Jones. Today, the building is used as administrative office space.

Fok Hall houses the Sokolov Honors College, which consists of administrative offices and classrooms. It was built in 1893 and is the oldest building on campus. Previously the Alumni Building, Fok Hall was renamed in 2014 after a $2.5 million donation to the university by Maria Fok, whose late husband was a professor and trustee of YSU.

In 2013, the former Wick Pollock Inn was converted into the university president's house. The three-year project to renovate the mansion cost YSU over $4 million.

The Veterans Resource Center houses the Office of Veteran Affairs, as well as lounges, computer labs, and community spaces reserved for student veterans, currently serving members of the military, and military-dependent students. Home to the YSU Foundation, Melnick Hall is also home to the university's public radio station, WYSU-FM 88.5, which is affiliated with NPR and American Public Media.

Bliss Hall is the home of the Cliffe College of Creative Arts, including the Departments of Art, Theater & Dance, and the Dana School of Music. This building also houses the Department of Communication with programs in communication studies, journalism, and multimedia communications. The building, completed in 1977, features the 390-seat Ford Theatre, the 248-seat Bliss Recital Hall, an experimental theatre, 80 practice rooms with Steinway pianos, a TV studio, and audio production labs, as well as the Judith Rae Solomon Gallery, and fully equipped ceramics, photography, metals, and other artistic studios.

Ward Beecher Hall houses the departments of biology, chemistry, physics and astronomy. The five-story original unit was constructed in 1958, a major addition was built in 1967 and a small addition comprising chemical storerooms was completed in 1997. The building contains 31 laboratories, including a planetarium and greenhouse, nine classrooms, 53 faculty-research rooms, and a seminar room. Ward Beecher houses the university's planetarium, which opened in 1967 and includes a planetarium projector.

Tod Hall houses the administrative offices of many university officials, including the president, provost, and the Board of Trustees, as well as the Offices of Assessment, Marketing Communications, Human Resources, and others. Other academic buildings on campus include Beeghly Hall, Coffelt Hall, Cushwa Hall, DeBartolo Hall, Fedor Hall, Cafaro Hall, Meshel Hall, Moser Hall, Silvestri Hall, Sweeney Hall, and Williamson Hall.

=== Steubenville campus ===
In 2025, YSU reached an agreement with the Jefferson County Board of Commissioners to acquire the property of Eastern Gateway Community College in Steubenville, Ohio, which sits roughly 50 miles (81.3 kilometers) south of the main campus, and opened a satellite campus on the site. The deal was completed later that year, and the campus opened in fall 2026. The Steubenville Campus is Youngstown State's first satellite campus in its history, making it another public university in Ohio with multiple campuses.

As of Fall 2026, the Steubenville Campus offers associate degree programs in the following areas:

- Associate of Applied Science in Criminal Justice, Early Childhood Associate Pre-K, Information Technology, Machining, Nursing (ADN), Radiologic Technology, Social Work, Welding
- Associate of Arts in Business Administration, CLASS, Teacher Education
- Associate of Individualized Studies

The Campus also offers Certificate programs in:

- Police Academy
- Welding
- Machining
- Medical Assisting

As of 2026, the Steubenville Campus of Youngstown State does not offer any degree programs higher than the associate degree level.

== Academics ==
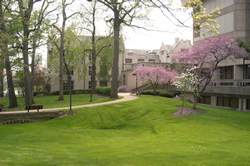
Greenspace between Jones Hall and Maag Library (right)

The university comprises seven undergraduate and graduate colleges:

- Beeghly College of Liberal Arts, Social Science & Education
- Bitonte College of Health and Human Services
- Cliffe College of Creative Arts
- College of Science, Technology, Engineering, and Mathematics
- Williamson College of Business Administration
- College of Graduate Studies
- Sokolov Honors College

YSU offers approximately 100 undergraduate majors, 40 master's programs, and five doctoral degrees. It has partnerships with various other postsecondary institutions, including a juris doctor track with the University of Akron, a doctor of medicine track with the Lake Erie College of Osteopathic Medicine or Northeast Ohio Medical University, and master's programs with the University of Akron and Cleveland State University. The Steubenville campus offers 12 associate's degree programs and four certification programs.

The Dana School of Music at Youngstown State University was deemed an "All-Steinway" school in 2004. The Dana School of Music is one of the oldest non-conservatory schools of music in the United States. The Williamson College of Business is accredited by the Association to Advance Collegiate Schools of Business (AACSB).

In addition to traditional four-year programs, Youngstown State University also offers online degree programs and three-year degree pathways. Since 2004, YSU has participated in the Youngstown Early College program, through which students from the Youngstown City School District can take courses for college credit and earn an associate's degree while in high school.

=== Centers and institutes ===
YSU operates several Centers of Excellence and designated research and economic development programs, including the Center for Transportation and Materials Engineering, the Center of Excellence in Materials Science and Engineering, the Center of Excellence in International Business, the Center for Applied Chemical Biology, the Institute for Applied Topology, and effective in 2012, the Natural Gas and Water Resources Institute. Youngstown State University is also home to the Center for Working Class Studies and offers a Regional and American Studies program, which was the first of its kind in the United States. The school assisted the University of Chicago in developing a similar program.

The McDonough Museum of Art is one of two art museums located in Youngstown. The McDonough Museum of Art is closely affiliated with the university, acting as an outreach for the Department of Art. The 14,000 sq. ft. space serves as a showing facility for art students and faculty alike, as well as local and regional talents.

The university's Center for Judaic and Holocaust Studies was put into jeopardy when Jacob Ari Labendz, the only professor at YSU qualified to teach Holocaust studies, was laid off in 2021.

=== Library ===
The Maag Library opened in 1976 and was named after one of the local public library and Youngstown State University's trustees, William F. Maag, Jr. Before it opened, Maag Library became a member of the Federal Depository Library Program in 1971. Currently, it is a six-story building with over 500,000 volumes in-house, as well as access to the collections of 84 other Ohio institutions via participation in the OhioLINK program. The building also houses the writing center and the university's English Language Institute.

Located on the fifth floor of Maag Library, the Archives and Special Collections at Youngstown State is meant to preserve items with historical significance to the school, Youngstown and Mahoning County, as well as its history in the iron and steel industry.

=== Rankings ===
Academic rankings

Master's
- Washington Monthly: 365

Regional
- U.S. News & World Report: 99

In Washington Monthly's 2025 Master's University Rankings, Youngstown State University was ranked 365th out of 585 master's level institutions across the United States. In the 2025 U.S. News & World Report college rankings, Youngstown State University was ranked 99th out of 165 regional universities in the Midwest, and 35th among public universities.

== Student life ==
As of fall 2019, the student body totaled approximately 12,155, 10% of whom were dual-enrolled high school students. YSU has approximately 2,100 full and part-time employees and 426 full-time faculty with 543 part-time faculty. 165 faculty members have full-professor rank, with 79% of the instructors holding doctorates or terminal degrees. The university has a student-to-faculty ratio of 14:1.

YSU owns and operates five on-campus residence halls: Cafaro House, Kilcawley House, Lyden House, Weller House, and Wick House. Numerous privately owned student apartment complexes are located close to YSU's campus.

== Athletics ==
Youngstown athletics monogram

The Youngstown State Penguins is the name given to the athletic teams of YSU. The university is a member of the National Collegiate Athletic Association's (NCAA) Division I, and the Penguins compete in football as members of the Missouri Valley Football Conference. Most other sports compete as members of the Horizon League. Sports teams include baseball, basketball, cross country, football, golf, swimming, diving, tennis, track and field, volleyball, softball, soccer, lacrosse, and bowling.

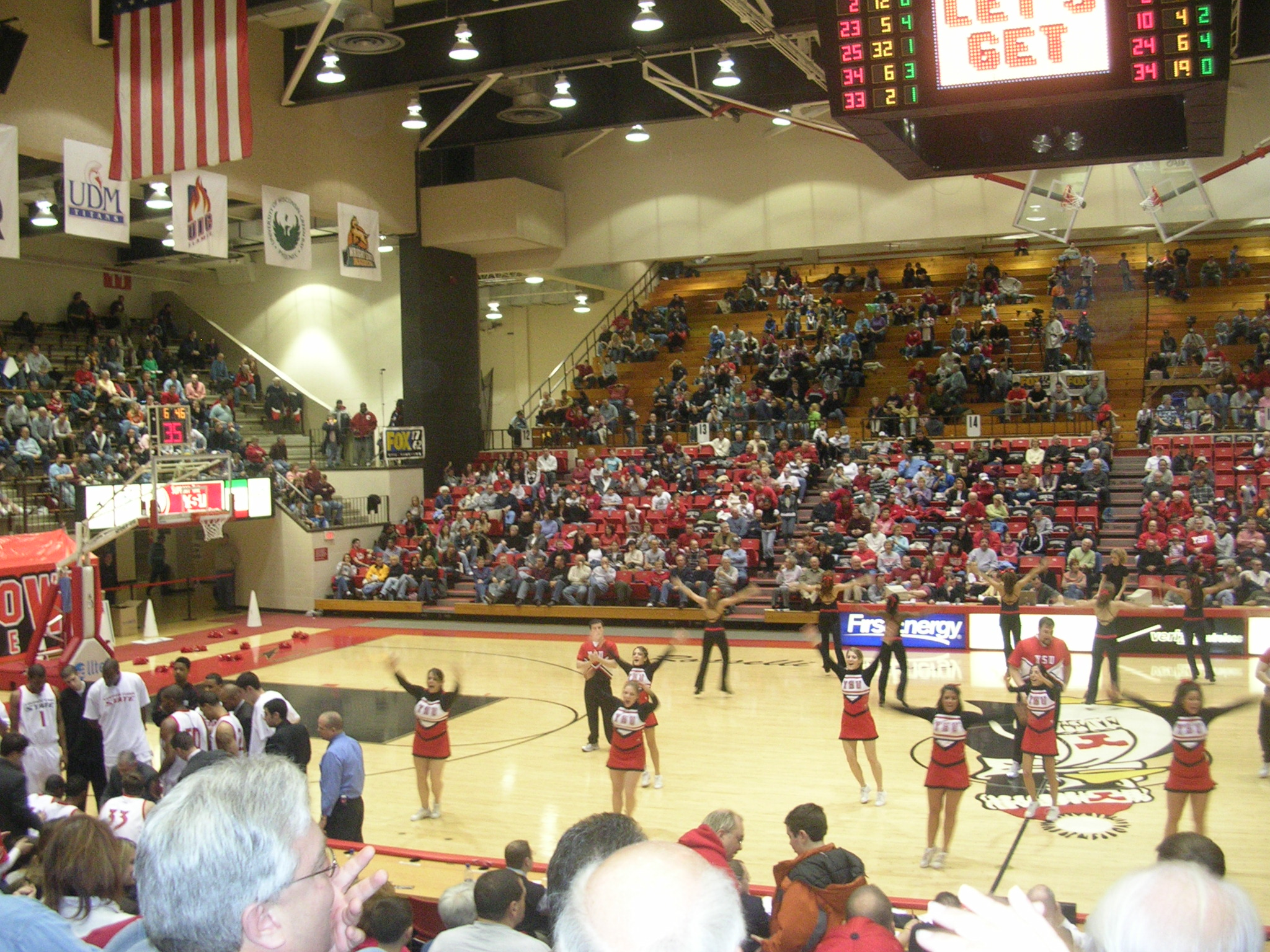
Beeghly Center hosts several sports.

The Youngstown State Penguins football team plays as a member of the NCAA Division I Football Championship Subdivision. The Penguins have played their home games in Stambaugh Stadium since 1982. YSU football has been one of the leading programs in NCAA Division I Football Championship Subdivision, winning four national championships under former head coach Jim Tressel, which is third behind North Dakota State's ten titles and Georgia Southern's six. Overall, YSU has made 14 playoff appearances since Division I FCS was formed in 1978.

The Youngstown State Penguins women's basketball and Youngstown State Penguins men's basketball teams compete at Beeghly Center, a 4,633-seat, multi-purpose arena built in 1972. The women's team has appeared in the NCAA Division I Tournament three times. The men's team has appeared in the NCAA Division II Tournament nine times and the NAIA tournament four times.
