= Štěpánek =

Štěpánek (Czech pronunciation: [ˈʃcɛpaːnɛk]; Czech feminine: Štěpánková) is a Czech surname. it is a diminutive form of Štěpán. Notable people with the surname include:

- Alex Stepanek (born 1963), German tennis player
- Brian Stepanek (born 1971), American actor
- David Štěpánek (born 1997), Czech footballer
- Emil Stepanek (1895–1945), Austrian set designer and film architect
- Jakub Štěpánek, Czech ice hockey player
- Josef Štěpánek Netolický (1460–1539), Czech fishpond builder and architect
- Lucie Štěpánková (born 1981), Czech actress
- Martin Štěpánek (actor) (1947–2010), Czech actor
- Martin Štěpánek (freediver) (born 1977), Czech freediver
- Martin Štěpánek (tennis) (born 1979), Czech tennis player
- Mattie Stepanek (1990–2004), American poet and advocate
- Miroslav Štěpánek (artist) (1930–2005), Czech artist
- Miroslav Štěpánek (footballer) (born 1990), Czech footballer
- Nicole Vaidišová Štěpánková, Czech tennis player
- Ondřej Štěpánek (born 1979), Czech slalom canoeist
- Pavel Štěpánek (born 1931), Czech psychic
- Petr Štěpánek (born 1948), Czech actor
- Radek Štěpánek (born 1978), Czech tennis player
- Stephen Stepanek (born 1951), American politician
- Svatoslav Štěpánek (1911–1938), Czech serial killer
- Vratislav Štěpánek (1930–2013), Czech Hussite bishop
- Zdeněk Štěpánek (1896–1968), Czech actor
