= Kalous =

Kalous (feminine: Kalousová) is a Czech surname, meaning 'long-eared owl'. A diminutive form is Kalousek. Notable people with the surname include:

- Andrea Kalousová (born 1996), Czech model and beauty pageant titleholder
