= Makowiec =

Makowiec may refer to:

- Makowiec (pastry), a Polish cake (flat or rolled) layered with poppy seed-based paste
- Makowiec, Kuyavian-Pomeranian Voivodeship (north-central Poland)
- Makowiec, Masovian Voivodeship (east-central Poland)

== See also ==
- Makovec, a cognate
