= Nemechek =

Nemechek is a surname, an Anglicized version of the Czech surname Němeček. Notable people with the surname include:

- Francis Nemechek (born 1950), American serial killer
- Joe Nemechek (born 1963), NASCAR driver
  - John Nemechek (1970–1997), brother of Joe
  - John Hunter Nemechek (born 1997), son of Joe
