= Senate district 7 – Plzeň-City =

Electoral district in the Czech Republic

Coordinates: 49°30′17″N 13°23′44″E

7 – Plzeň-City
- inline Senate district of the Czech Republic

- The Plzeň-City district on a map
- Senator: Daniela Kovářová; Independent
- Region: Plzeň
- District: Plzeň-South; Plzeň-City; Klatovy
- Electorate: 106,229
- Area: 1,514.28km²
- Last election: 2022
- Next election: 2028

Senate district 7 – Plzeň-City is an electoral district of the Senate of the Czech Republic, located around and in the city of Plzeň and consisting of the whole of Plzeň-South District and parts of Klatovy and Plzeň-City Districts. In 2022, independent Daniela Kovářová was elected Senator for the district.

== Senators ==
| Year | Senator | Party |
|---|---|---|
| 1996 (Note: Election for shortened two-year term) | Jaroslav Jurečka | ODS |
| 1998 | Jiří Skalický | 4KOALICE |
| 2004 | Jiří Šneberger | ODS |
| 2010 | Dagmar Terelmešová | ČSSD |
| 2016 | Václav Chaloupek | OPAT |
| 2022 | Daniela Kovářová | Independent |

== Elections ==
=== 1996 ===
1996 Czech Senate election in Plzeň-City
| Candidate | Party | 1st round | | 2nd round | |
| Candidate | Party | Votes | % | Votes | % |
|---|---|---|---|---|---|
| Jaroslav Jurečka | ODS | 15 667 | 41,88 | 18 492 | 51,59 |
| Jiří Poděbradský | ČSSD | 9 822 | 26,26 | 17 350 | 48,41 |
| Josef Morávek | KSČM | 5 080 | 13,58 | — | — |
| Václav Červený | KDU-ČSL | 4 610 | 12,32 | — | — |
| Pavel Rada | ČSNS | 1 032 | 2,76 | — | — |
| Zdeněk Šimáček | SZ | 756 | 2,02 | — | — |
| Richard Knot | NEI | 438 | 1,17 | — | — |

=== 1998 ===
1998 Czech Senate election in Pleň-City
| Candidate | Party | 1st round | | 2nd round | |
| Candidate | Party | Votes | % | Votes | % |
|---|---|---|---|---|---|
| Jiří Skalický | 4KOALICE | 10 047 | 25,51 | 10 156 | 54,09 |
| Jaroslav Jurečka | ODS | 10 881 | 27,62 | 8 619 | 46,91 |
| Jiří Poděbradský | ČSSD | 9 774 | 24,81 | — | — |
| Ivana Levá | KSČM | 6 824 | 17,32 | — | — |
| Světla Brendlová | NEZ | 1 866 | 4,74 | — | — |

=== 2004 ===
2004 Czech Senate election in Plzeň-City
| Candidate | Party | 1st round | |
| Candidate | Party | Votes | % |
|---|---|---|---|
| Jiří Šneberger | ODS | 14 650 | 50,52 |
| Milada Emmerová | ČSSD | 4 882 | 16,83 |
| Zdeňka Hornofová | KSČM | 4 675 | 16,12 |
| Jiří Vačkář | KDU-ČSL | 3 097 | 10,68 |
| Václav Havlík | NEZ | 1 689 | 5,82 |

=== 2010 ===
2010 Czech Senate election in Plzeň-City
| Candidate | Party | 1st round | | 2nd round | |
| Candidate | Party | Votes | % | Votes | % |
|---|---|---|---|---|---|
| Dagmar Terelmešová | ČSSD | 11 530 | 26,34 | 14 154 | 54,06 |
| Jiří Šneberger | ODS | 12 534 | 28,64 | 12 026 | 45,93 |
| Pavel Čížek | TOP 09, STAN | 6 202 | 14,17 | — | — |
| Richard Sequens | SZ | 5 777 | 13,20 | — | — |
| Karel Kvit | KSČM | 4 508 | 10,30 | — | — |
| František Pillmann | Suverenity | 2 086 | 4,76 | — | — |
| Oldřich Kodeda | KČ | 592 | 1,35 | — | — |
| Jan Kůrka | SPOZ | 529 | 1,20 | — | — |

=== 2016 ===
2016 Czech Senate election in Plzeň-City
| Candidate | Party | 1st round | | 2nd round | |
| Candidate | Party | Votes | % | Votes | % |
|---|---|---|---|---|---|
| Václav Chaloupek | OPAT | 6 424 | 18,41 | 8 996 | 60,71 |
| Dagmar Terelmešová | ČSSD | 6 261 | 17,94 | 5 802 | 39,28 |
| Miloslava Rutová | ANO 2011 | 5 859 | 16,79 | — | — |
| Marcel Hájek | ODS, KDU-ČSL | 5 771 | 16,54 | — | — |
| Jiří Dort | TOP 09, STAN | 4 650 | 13,32 | — | — |
| Jan Rejftek | KSČM | 3 196 | 9,16 | — | — |
| Pavel Havlíček | SsČR | 1 596 | 4,57 | — | — |
| Martin Koller | Dawn | 1 131 | 3,24 | — | — |

=== 2022 ===
2022 Czech Senate election in Plzeň-City
| Candidate | Party | 1st round | | 2nd round | |
| Candidate | Party | Votes | % | Votes | % |
|---|---|---|---|---|---|
| Daniela Kovářová | Independent | 9 684 | 21,96 | 10 707 | 54,06 |
| Karel Naxera | TOP 09, ODS, KDU-ČSL | 10 112 | 22,93 | 9 096 | 45,93 |
| Josef Váňa | ANO 2011 | 8 923 | 20,23 | — | — |
| Václav Chaloupek | STAN, OPAT | 5 309 | 12,03 | — | — |
| Pavel Šrámek | FOR PLZEŇ | 4 683 | 10,61 | — | — |
| Jan Kůrka | SPD | 2 833 | 6,42 | — | — |
| Jiří Valenta | KSČM | 2 554 | 5,79 | — | — |
