= Kateřina Čapková =

Kateřina Čapková (born 1973) is a Czech historian and researcher at Institute of Contemporary History, Prague. She has taught at NYU Prague and Charles University. Her father was the Protestant theologian Petr Pokorný (1933–2020).

== Works ==
- Čapková, Kateřina (2005). Češi, Němci, Židé?: Národní identita Židů v Čechách 1918-1938 (in Czech). Paseka. ISBN 978-80-7185-695-5.
  - Čapková, Kateřina (2012). Czechs, Germans, Jews?: National Identity and the Jews of Bohemia. Berghahn Books. ISBN 978-0-85745-475-1.
- Čapková, Kateřina; Frankl, Michal (2008). Nejisté útočiště: Československo a uprchlíci před nacismem 1933-1938 (in Czech). Paseka. ISBN 978-80-7185-840-9.
  - Čapková, Kateřina; Frankl, Michal (2012). Unsichere Zuflucht: die Tschechoslowakei und ihre Flüchtlinge aus NS-Deutschland und Österreich 1933-1938 (in German). Böhlau. ISBN 978-3-412-20925-4.
- Čapková, Kateřina; Kieval, Hillel J., eds. (2021). Prague and Beyond: Jews in the Bohemian Lands. University of Pennsylvania Press. ISBN 978-0-8122-9959-5.
  - Čapková, Kateřina; Kieval, Hillel J., eds. (2020). Zwischen Prag und Nikolsburg: jüdisches Leben in den böhmischen Ländern (in German). Vandenhoeck & Ruprecht. ISBN 978-3-525-36427-7.
