= Potměšil =

Potměšil (feminine: Potměšilová) is a Czech surname. Notable people with the surname include:

- Jan Potměšil (1966–2026), Czech actor
- Ladislav Potměšil (1945–2021), Czech actor
