= Slanina (surname) =

Slanina is a Slavic unisex surname. Notable people with the surname include:

- Ashley Slanina-Davies (born 1989), English actress
- Donatas Slanina (born 1977), Lithuanian basketball player
- Katharina Slanina (born 1977), German politician
- Vladimír Slanina (born 1994), Czech male canoeist
- Vladimír Slanina Sr. (born 1969), Czech male canoeist
