= Nováček =

Nováček (feminine Nováčková) is a Czech surname. Notable people with the surname include:

- Jay Novacek (born 1962), American football tight end of Czech descent
- Jitka Nováčková (born 1992), Czech model
- Karel Nováček (born 1965), Czech tennis player
- Libor Nováček (born 1979), Czech-English violinist, poet
- Ottokar Nováček (1866–1900), Hungarian violinist and composer of Czech descent
- Roman Nováček (born 1969), Czech judo-player
- Rudolf Nováček (1860–1929), Czech composer and conductor
- Stephanie Novacek (born 1970), American operatic mezzo-soprano of Czech descent
- Zuzana Nováčková (born 1945), Czech printmaker
