= Mary Grace Kovar =

American biostatistician (1929–2015)

- Born: July 6, 1929
- Died: September 21, 2015 (aged 86)
- Occupation: Statistician
- Spouse: Earl S. Pollack

Mary Grace Kovar (July 6, 1929 – September 21, 2015) was an American statistician.

Kovar worked as chief of the Analytical Coordination Branch of the Division of Analysis at the National Center for Health Statistics.

For many years she was the coordinator of Health, United States, a series of books reporting the health statistics of Americans. By 1996, she had retired from the NCHS, and had become a senior research scientist at NORC at the University of Chicago. She was a vice president at NORC by 2000.

She married Earl S. Pollack, a biostatistician at the National Institutes of Health. Pollack died in 2012.

The topics of some of Kovar's best-cited publications include trends in blood lead levels,^{[A]} infant nutrition and its effects on health,^{[B]} patterns of sensitivity to allergens,^{[C]}, longitudinal studies of aging,^{[D]} and a comparison of the results of in-person interviews versus telephone surveys.^{[E]}

Kovar was elected as a Fellow of the American Statistical Association in 1979, seven years after Pollack. She became a fellow of the American Association for the Advancement of Science in 1990.

== Selected publications ==
A.	Annest, Joseph L.; Pirkle, James L.; Makuc, Diane; Neese, Jane W.; Bayse, David D.; Kovar, Mary Grace (June 1983), "Chronological trend in blood lead levels between 1976 and 1980", New England Journal of Medicine, 308 (23): 1373–1377, doi:10.1056/nejm198306093082301, PMID 6188954

B.	Kovar, Mary Grace; Serdula, Mary K.; Marks, James S.; Fraser, David W. (October 1984), "Review of the epidemiologic evidence for an association between infant feeding and infant health", Pediatrics, 74 (4): 615–638, doi:10.1542/peds.74.4.615, S2CID 38885310

C.	Gergen, Peter J.; Turkeltaub, Paul C.; Kovar, Mary Grace (November 1987), "The prevalence of allergic skin test reactivity to eight common aeroallergens in the U.S. population: Results from the second National Health and Nutrition Examination Survey", Journal of Allergy and Clinical Immunology, 80 (5): 669–679, Bibcode:1987JACI...80..669G, doi:10.1016/0091-6749(87)90286-7, PMID 3680811

D.	Harris, T; Kovar, M G; Suzman, R; Kleinman, J C; Feldman, J J (June 1989), "Longitudinal study of physical ability in the oldest-old.", American Journal of Public Health, 79 (6): 698–702, doi:10.2105/ajph.79.6.698, PMC 1349624, PMID 2729466

E.	Nelson, David E.; Powell-Griner, Eve; Town, Machell; Kovar, Mary Grace (August 2003), "A comparison of national estimates from the National Health Interview Survey and the Behavioral Risk Factor Surveillance System", American Journal of Public Health, 93 (8): 1335–1341, doi:10.2105/ajph.93.8.1335, PMC 1447966, PMID 12893624
