= Svatoslav Štěpánek =

Czech serial killer

- Born: 25 December 1911; Roudnice nad Labem, Bohemia, Austria-Hungary
- Died: 8 November 1938 (aged 26); Pankrác Prison, Prague, Czechoslovakia
- Cause of death: Execution by hanging
- Other name: "The Roudnice Monster"
- Convictions: Murder x3 Attempted murder x2
- Penalty: Death

Details
- Victims: 3–5+
- Span of crimes: April 1926 – May 1936
- Country: Czechoslovakia
- Date apprehended: 17 May 1936

Svatoslav Štěpánek (25 December 1911 – 8 November 1938) was a Czech serial killer who killed at least one child and two women around Roudnice nad Labem between 1926 and 1936. Convicted of these crimes and two attempted murders, he was sentenced to death and subsequently executed in 1938. He was nicknamed "The Roudnice Monster".

== Early years ==
Svatoslav Štěpánek was born on 25 December 1911, in Roudnice nad Labem, the youngest of four children. He came from a respected family – his father was a chemist in a sugar factory and his mother a retired kindergarten teacher. Svatoslav, who suffered from meningitis soon after his premature birth and was physically weak, was doted upon by his mother. His father died when he was still young, prompting his mother to move him and his three siblings to the Slovak part of the country, where they remained for some time. After returning to Roudnice nad Labem, Štěpánek studied to become a gardener but never took any work.

In contrast to his siblings, Svatoslav was despised by other residents of his neighbourhood due to his odd and disconcerting behaviour: besides stealing items such as women's underwear, he also enjoyed dissecting frogs, liked to torture and kill animals, and visited the local cemetery to watch the gravedigger work. Štěpánek was also known for biting his classmates and relishing in their pain, and in the fifth grade, he is also said to have stabbed a classmate with a knife following an argument. In 1930, he was threatened with up to a year in prison for a theft, but his mother prevented it by arranging a psychiatric examination with a friend, who deduced that Štěpánek had mental issues. After the exam, the man also told his mother that the teenager had serious psychological issues and should seek immediate treatment, but Štěpánek's mother dismissed his advice.

== First murder ==
Štěpánek's first known murder took place in 1926 when he was still 16. On one occasion when he was left to watch over his sister, Štěpánek was visited by 5-year-old Bedřich Brožovský, the son of a couple who shared a rented apartment with him. It's unclear what exactly occurred on the day of the murder, but according to Štěpánek, he had become annoyed with Brožovský, luring him to the cellar where he hit him on the head with a hammer multiple times. In order to dispose of the body, he dismembered it and buried it in his garden. He would later be questioned about Brožovský's mysterious disappearance but claimed to know nothing of it. After some time, the local townsfolk and police alike came to the conclusion that little Bedřich had likely been kidnapped by a gang of gypsies, and with no leads, the case went cold.

== New crimes ==
=== Attempted murders ===
After an apparent 10-year lull, when he is not known to have committed any crimes, Štěpánek resumed his violent activities on 10 January 1936. On that day, while riding his bicycle around Roudnice nad Labem, he spotted 13-year-old Růžena Jebavá walking home from school. Štěpánek rode up to her, drew out his pistol and shot her in the left shoulder blade, narrowly missing her heart. With Jebavá left writhing on the ground, he rode a little further before suddenly returning, telling her "Here you go", and leaving again. She was found by passers-by and rushed to the hospital, where an early intervention by doctors saved her life.

Thirteen days later, 26-year-old Zdeňka Drobná came across Štěpánek, who was repairing his bicycle on the road, while en route home from visiting her husband in the hospital. When she went past him, Štěpánek went after her and knocked her into a nearby ditch, whereupon he began swearing at and threatening her. Drobná got up and tried to run away, but Štěpánek caught up with her again and aimed his pistol directly at her heart. She instinctively slapped his hand, causing him to fire a shot into her stomach. Despite successfully injuring his victim and about to finish her off with an axe, a passing witness scared off Štěpánek. The woman later told the authorities about the assault, but gave only a partially accurate description of her assailant, describing him as seemingly suffering from smallpox and with a drooping left corner on his mouth, but also giving the wrong colours for his bike and hair. When investigators came to question Štěpánek, his mother and neighbours provided him with a false alibi, claiming that he had been bed-ridden all day due to contracting influenza. Štěpánek himself would later admit that he only pretended to be ill, and significantly altered his bike's appearance following these attacks to prevent positive identification.

=== Murders ===
On 5 April 1936, 40-year-old dairy farmer Františka Třísková disappeared in the early morning while making her regular milk deliveries. When it was discovered that her probable last stop was the Štěpánek residence, whose current sole occupant was Svatoslav due to his mother undergoing surgery in Modra, the local authorities went to question him. Štěpánek denied seeing Třísková on that day, claiming that he had been sleeping and then gone to the evangelical church. He was cleared of suspicion after a friend of Třísková falsely claimed that she had talked to her for several hours, supposedly after she already visited the Štěpáneks' house. In actuality, Štěpánek shot Třísková in the head while she was pouring milk for him in the kitchen, before dragging the still-living victim to the laundry room and finishing her off with an axe blow to the head. He then ripped her belly open, cutting off her breasts and removing skin from her head, before finally dismembering the corpse into 11 pieces. After washing his clothes, he then wrapped the remains and a milk jug in bags and buried them in his backyard. Following her mother's disappearance, Třísková's daughter was tasked with doing the deliveries, and it is alleged that when she went to the Štěpáneks' house one day, Svatoslav asked her whether she knew anything new about her mother. When she replied in the negative, Štěpánek supposedly replied that she'll "see her soon".

While she was absent from the house, Štěpánek's mother had arranged for her sister, Anna, to make food for him. On 17 May, since she was busy, she decided to send in her 20-year-old daughter, Jiřina Šťastná, to deliver the food, explicitly forbidding her from entering the premises. Disregarding her mother's advice, Šťastná entered the house and hand-delivered the food to Svatoslav, who then proceeded to shoot her in the eye. To make sure she was dead, he then stabbed her in the heart, and then dragged the body to the cellar, where he undressed it, planning to mutilate it later. However, Anna, worried that her daughter still hadn't returned, sent her son to ask for her. Štěpánek claimed that she had left long ago and sent his cousin away, but unconvinced by his claims, Anna went to the house herself. While examining the surroundings, she noticed a bag that her daughter used to carry food in. Knowing that she would never leave without it, she began inspecting it, noticing that it had traces of blood on it, leading to the cellar. She then went down there, where she discovered her daughter's nude body.

Bewildered by the discovery, Anna confronted Štěpánek, who panicked and tried to flee. He managed to escape into the garden and subsequently went to a nearby hill, where he attempted to hang himself from a tree. A passing postmaster noticed this, however, rescuing the young man and then escorting him to the police station.

== Arrest, confessions and excavations ==
In the subsequent interrogations, Štěpánek was questioned about what he planned to do with the body, to which he replied that he was curious to see how the breasts of a young woman would look like if they were cut off, and he had intended to dismembered in the bathtub later on. He also revealed that he had written a letter for his aunt, describing how horribly mutilated his cousin's body was but not implicating himself as the killer, which he intended to give it to her and watch her freak out for his own amusement.

Aside from this, one detail from Štěpánek's testimony, proclaiming that he planned to bury Šťastná's body in the garden "with the others", prompted investigators to begin examining his garden. Eventually, they noticed disturbed soil in one section of the backyard, which they dug out, finding splinters and one empty grave. Following this, the entirety of the house was excavated, and to the investigators' shock, they found another, smaller grave. Digging deeper into Štěpánek's history, the investigators realized that this victim was likely little Bedřich Brožovský, who had disappeared ten years ago.

=== Probable murders ===
Police were sceptical of the 10-year gap from Brožovský's killing to Štěpánek's other murders, so they reopened several cold cases in an effort to examine any possible connections with their detainee. For reference, they used a peculiar map found in Štěpánek's room, on which he had marked several places with crosses: one of them was placed in Bohnice, where on 2 August 1932, 28-year-old Mária Zemancová was found stabbed by the road near Troja. She had been stabbed twice, once in the neck and another in the chest, and it appeared that her killer had attempted to cut off her breasts. At the time, Štěpánek is known to have stayed with a local greengrocer in Prague. At first, he denied any involvement in the murder, but later confessed and attended a reconstruction of the crime scene, pointing out the exact location and minute details, such as the knife's handle breaking, that only the killer would have known. In the middle of the reconstruction, however, he changed his mind and withdrew his confession. Witnesses who had seen Zemancová's killer also couldn't positively identify Štěpánek and his own description of the victim was inaccurate. As a result, he was dismissed as a suspect.

On 16 October 1932, he was part of a tour group exploring the Červený Kameň Castle near the Slovak village of Častá. At one point, while he was examining the various medieval torture instruments, he got lost in the company of friend, 15-year-old Marie Riganová. At closing time, the security guards eventually found Štěpánek wandering around, but Riganová was never found, and remains missing to this day.

== Trial, conviction and execution ==
At his trial, Štěpánek admitted that he committed the murders due to his unnatural fixation on breasts. Prosecutors revealed when he was 17, he had poured hydrochloric acid on his sister's breasts, kept pictures of well-endowed women plastered all over his bed and even took a breast growth product. His sexually sadistic tendencies were also emphasized, including an incident where he injured his nipple by intentionally pricking it on a tree. And to the shock and disgust of the court, they also produced another letter written by Štěpánek, in which he fantasized about being a raped young mother who resorts to killing her hungry child and cutting off her nipples due to her inability to breastfeed him. During the trial proceedings, his mother died.

In 1938, Svatoslav Štěpánek was found guilty of threefold murder and two attempted murders, for which he was sentenced to death. He would submit a request for clemency, but the response was delayed as the country had no sitting president at the time. His request would eventually be denied by the government, and on 8 November 1938, Štěpánek was hanged in the courtyard of the Pankrác Prison.

== See also ==
- List of serial killers by country
