= Alexandra Chalupa =

American lawyer

- Born: 1976 or 1977 (age 48–49); Davis, California, United States
- Citizenship: United States
- Education: University of Sydney(MA IntlSec); University of California, Berkeley (BA, Rhetoric); University of California, Davis (JD)
- Occupations: Ph.D. candidate Lawyer; Consultant
- Spouse: Jeff Roof
- Children: 3
- Parents: Leo M. Chalupa (father); Tanya Chalupa (mother)

Alexandra Stephania Chalupa (Note: Ukrainian: Олександра Стефанія Чалупа, romanized: Oleksandra Stefaniia Chalupa) (born 1976 or 1977) is an American lawyer and researcher with expertise in International Security and political warfare. She was co-chair of the Democratic National Committee's (DNC's) Ethnic Council and the founder of the political consulting firm Chalupa & Associates, LLC. She is a pro-Ukrainian activist and human rights advocate.

During Ukraine's Revolutionary of Dignity (2013-2014) Chalupa volunteered with Barack Obama's administration, including the Vice President's Office and National Security Council to help build stronger relationships with the Ukrainian American community and other stakeholders supporting human rights and pro-democracy protestors in Kyiv.

After the publication of a 2017 Politico article, Chalupa became embroiled in a controversy that alleged past activities were part of a conspiracy between the DNC and the Ukrainian government to undermine Trump's campaign.

== Early life ==
Chalupa was born in Davis, California, to Tanya Keis and Leo M. Chalupa, both Ukrainian immigrants. Tanya was born in a United Nations refugee camp in Heidenheim, Germany after World War II. Tanya's and Leo's parents brought them to the United States as children seeking asylum from the Soviet Union, and they grew up in the Bronx, New York. As a couple, they moved to California, where Leo earned a PhD in neuroscience from UCLA and became a professor at UC Davis.

When Chalupa was 2–1/2, her life was saved by a child car seat when her parents' car spun out of control and crashed while traversing the Alps in Italy. The incident led her mother to single-handedly wage a successful 2-year lobbying campaign in the California legislature for a mandatory child safety seat law that passed in 1982.

Chalupa attended Davis Senior High School, majored in Rhetoric and minored in peace and conflict studies at UC Berkeley, and received her J.D. degree from UC Davis. In 2024, she earned a Master of International Security at the University of Sydney.

== Career ==
While attending UC Berkeley Chalupa started her political career working for Republican California Governor Pete Wilson in the Capitol and San Francisco offices. She then worked for Democrats, including Congressman Vic Fazio, Phil Angelides campaign for Treasurer, and in the White House during the Clinton administration in the Office of Public Liaison. After law school, she served on the John Kerry presidential campaign and then as a senior staffer and eventually as a consultant for the Democratic National Convention. According to FEC records, she was paid $412,000 from 2004 to June 2016 by the DNC, including as Executive Director of Democrats Abroad, the DNC's arm for engaging American voters residing abroad, Director of the Office of DNC Vice Chairs, and senior advisor to the DNC Chair.

=== 2016 presidential election ===
In 2014, Chalupa volunteered to help the Obama White House during Ukraine's Revolution of Dignity, including organizing meetings for the Vice President's Office and National Security Council with Ukrainian American leaders and other stakeholders. It was during this time she first warned the administration about her concerns regarding American political operative Paul Manafort and his continued work for the Kremlin and pro-Putin politicians in Ukraine. As she testified under oath to the Federal Election Commission, she never made any money nor had any clients (paid or pro bono) related to Ukraine, as was reported by Ken Vogel of POLITICO.

She began warning Ukrainian-American community leaders and the Executives of the DNC in January 2016 that Manafort was Russian president Vladimir Putin's "political brain for manipulating U.S. foreign policy and elections and her concerns that he was involved in the U.S. election even though he did not publicly join any campaign at that point." She shared her concerns with a senior DNC official, saying that a connection between the Trump campaign and Russia would likely mean Manafort would become involved in the election. In March, she visited the Ukrainian embassy in Washington, D.C., to organize an event in June highlighting female Ukrainian leaders, Ukrainian culture, and educating about Russia's war. She shared her concerns with Ambassador Valeriy Chaly and his aide Oksana Shulyar.

Manafort joined the Trump campaign a few days later as a senior advisor and later became campaign chairman. The day after the campaign announced Manafort's joining, Chalupa briefed the DNC's communications staff on Manafort's and Trump's ties to Russia. A week later, Chalupa met with a foreign policy legislative assistant to Representative Marcy Kaptur in a failed attempt to start a congressional investigation into Manafort's activities. Chalupa also initiated a protest with other Ukrainian Americans in Manafort's hometown of New Britain, CT calling for the Republican operative to be removed from the campaign and for a street in the town named after his father to be renamed "Heavenly Hundred" in honor of the Ukrainian protestors massacred in Kyiv demonstrating against Manafort's longtime client Yanukovych, as described in Russian Roulette (Isikoff and Corn book).

After the election, Chalupa assisted the Clinton campaign with their efforts to force vote recounts in some states.

==== FBI outreach ====
During the 2016 election, Chalupa proactively tried to reached out to the FBI several times with concerns about Manafort and active measures she experienced, including requesting to speak with the FBI agent working with the DNC. She testified before the U.S. Senate Intelligence Committee and FEC that DNC General Counsel Marc Elias, who secretly financed the Steele Dossier, blocked her from speaking with the FBI on multiple occasions. She finally spoke on the phone to the agent assigned to the Democratic National Convention who took down her information and passed it on to his colleagues in counter intelligence. On September 14, 2016, after she quit the DNC weeks earlier, Chalupa was interviewed by two agents from the FBI at her home and she asked them to conduct forensics on her electronics that she suspected were compromised by Russian hackers. In 2019, U.S. Senators loyal to Trump who called for investigations against Chalupa, including Chuck Grassley, Ron Johnson, and Lindsey Graham tried to pressure the FBI Director to provide them with the contents of Chalupa's computer and phone imagining. In media interviews and during a Congressional hearing Trump-appointed FBI Director Christopher Wray debunked claims that Ukraine interfered in the 2016 U.S. election.

==== Ukrainian embassy ====
The Ukrainian embassy did not collaborate with Chalupa to expose Manafort, as Chalupa tested under oath. While falsely accused by Republicans, Chalupa publicly volunteered to testify during Trump's first impeachment. According to Politico, the DNC encouraged Chalupa to ask the Ukrainian embassy to arrange a call with Ukrainian president Petro Poroshenko to discuss Manafort, Trump, and their connections to Russia, but the embassy declined.

Andrii Telizhenko, who worked in the embassy as third secretary under Shulyar at the time, was the main source for Ken Vogel and Chris Stern's POLITICO article accusing Chalupa and Democrats of working with Ukraine to try to "sabotage" Trump's campaign. Telizhenko was later sanctioned by the U.S. Department of the Treasury's Office of Foreign Assets Control (OFAC) for his work with Russian agent Andrii Derkach in executing "Russian disinformation campaigns targeting American citizens" and "threatening democracy."

In 2018, Telizhenko told the Ukrainian news site Strana.UA that Poroshenko worked with Chalupa to discredit Trump. He began repeating the story in 2019 to U.S. right-wing media, Trump's personal lawyer Rudy Giuliani, and House Intelligence Committee minority chair Devin Nunes. Oleg Voloshyn, a Russian former Ukrainian lawmaker close with Yanukovych and Manafort, also accused Poroshenko and Chaly of favoring the Clinton campaign and called for an investigation into the alleged cooperation between Chalupa and the Ukrainian Embassy. Both the embassy and Chalupa disputed the allegations. Ambassador Chaly denied any wrongdoing and called Telizhenko a liar. In 2023, Voloshyn was accused by Ukraine of state treason for "promoting the military-political leadership of the Russian Federation in subversive activities against Ukraine."

In early 2019, Trump's private lawyer and Manafort's longtime associate Rudy Giuliani pushed for Ukraine to investigate Chalupa and the Bidens, working with opinion writer John Solomon to plant related stories in The Hill, which later centered in Trump's first impeachment hearings. Several months later, the publication conducted an extensive multi-panel investigation into Solomon's 14 Ukraine related opinion pieces, and found that his writings were unreliable and often included sources that could not be trusted. One of the articles included in the investigation involved Chaly, who while under pressure by Trump's associates, provided a written statement to The Hill, and claimed that Chalupa had approached the embassy in 2016 and tried to push the embassy to assist with supplying information on Manafort, including a request to allow a journalist to ask President Poroshenko questions about Manaforts dealings in Ukraine. He clarified Manafort was her own cause. He said "the Embassy representatives unambiguously refused to get involved in any way, as we were convinced that this is a strictly U.S. domestic matter." Chalupa was open about the fact she tried to connect American journalists to Ukraine's embassy and encouraged Ukrainian journalists to work with their American counterparts to teach them about Manafort's Kremlin-linked work in Ukraine, but publicly denied Chaly's accusations that she asked for documents or research related to the Republican operative. Despite this, a pro-Trump Political Action Committee used Chaly's statement to launch a second FEC complaint against Chalupa timed during Trump's impeachment. The FEC dismissed it for lack of evidence and based on Chalupa's under oath testimony during the first related FEC investigation launched against her in 2017 by Mathew Whitaker when he was Executive Director of FACT, which was found to be based on "Russian disinformation". Valeriy Chaly's Ambassadorship ended less than two months after his letter to the publication, and less than a week before Trump's infamous call with Zelenskyy pressuring the recently elected Ukrainian president to launch investigations into Trump's opponents, which sparked his impeachment. The following year, a Republican-led U.S. Select Intelligence Senate Committee report was released that concluded Manafort's presence on Trump's campaign was "a grave national security threat" and that he worked with Russian intelligence agents and oligarchs in Putin's circle before, during, and after the 2016 election, and had multiple communications with the Ukrainian embassy during this period.

==== Intimidation campaign ====
In late April 2016, Chalupa began receiving daily administrative alerts from Yahoo! warning her that state actors were attempting to break into her email account. After two weeks of daily alerts, she informed the DNC about the hacking attempts. That email became public when WikiLeaks published stolen DNC emails in July. The alerts continued into 2017.

In June 2016, someone broke into and searched her car, but left everything behind. She became convinced it was Russia-linked when her car was broken into and ransacked two more times but nothing was stolen. On one occasion a Ukrainian blouse that had been in a dry cleaning bag in the back seat was draped over the front seat. A few days later, a woman "wearing a white flowers in her hair" (like a Ukrainian headpiece) tried to break into Chalupa's home. She mentioned the incident to Shulyar, who told her it resembled intimidation campaigns used against foreigners in Russia. Chalupa began receiving death threats in the second half of 2016.

==== FEC complaints ====
The conservative watchdog group Foundation for Accountability and Civic Trust filed a complaint against Chalupa and the DNC with the Federal Election Commission (FEC) in August 2017. The complaint alleges that the research assistance the Ukrainian embassy provided to her during the 2016 election campaign was an illegal campaign contribution to the DNC because of her work for them at the time. The pro-Trump super PAC Committee to Defend the President filed a similar FEC complaint against the DNC in September 2019, alleging that the DNC ordered Chalupa to investigate Manafort and Trump.

In 2019, the FEC sent a letter to Chalupa stating that its attorneys "found reason to believe that you violated [the Federal Election Campaign Act] by soliciting, accepting or receiving contributions from foreign nationals" and that "the Ukrainian Embassy made in-kind contributions to the DNC by performing opposition research on the Trump campaign at no charge to the DNC." In a separate letter sent to the DNC, the FEC said that the DNC "does not directly deny that Chalupa obtained assistance from the Ukrainians nor that she passed on the Ukrainian Embassy's research to DNC officials." And that DNC officials "may have authorized Chalupa to act as an intermediary [with the Embassy] to solicit and receive negative information about the Trump campaign."

In 2021, the FEC voted 4-2 to dismiss the allegations that Chalupa or the DNC had violated any federal campaign laws. The FEC general counsel's office concluded that Chalupas actions amounted to soliciting an illegal foreign contribution to aid the Clinton campaign, but Democratic Commissioner Ellen Weintraub said the investigation into the matter relied on tainted testimony from Andrii Telizhenko, who Weintraub claimed was a Russian agent.

==== Calls for DOJ investigation ====
U.S. Senator Chuck Grassley urged the Department of Justice (DOJ) on two occasions to investigate alleged coordination between Chalupa and the Ukrainian government to interfere in the 2016 election. In July 2017, he sent a letter in his capacity as chairman of the Senate Judiciary Committee. Chalupa denied the claims, saying that she acted as a part time consultant in 2016, and that she was never asked by DNC officials to "go to the Ukrainian Embassy to collect information." She did admit to meeting with representatives of the Ukrainian Embassy, but claimed that these meetings had to do with "Immigrant Heritage Month women's networking event." Grassley and Senator Ron Johnson sent a second letter in September 2019 in their capacities as the chairs of the Senate Finance and Homeland Security Committees. Both letters cite the 2017 Politico article as evidence.

==== Impeachment Inquiry ====
During the US Congress' 2019 Impeachment Inquiry hearings, House Intelligence Committee ranking member Devin Nunes several times cited Alexandra Chalupa as a fact witness that committee chairman Adam Schiff refused to bring before the committee. Chalupa responded that she would welcome the opportunity to testify and push back against the Republican narrative about her involvement with Ukrainian officials.

== See also ==
- Russian interference in the 2016 United States elections
