= Evžen Rošický =

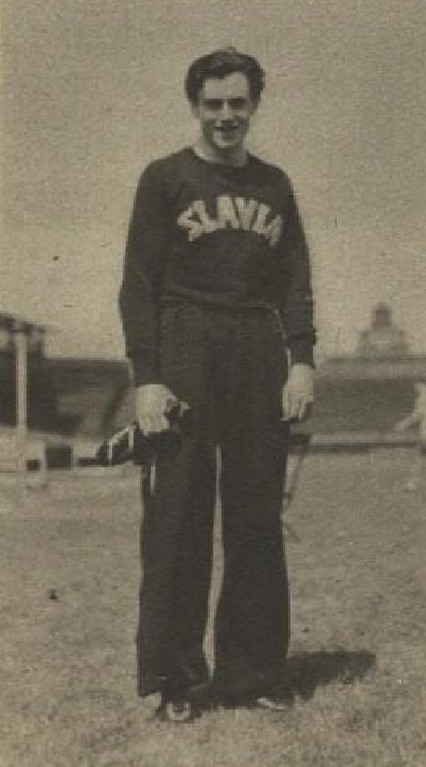
Evžen Rošický.

Evžen Rošický (15 October 1914 Olomouc – 25 June 1942 Prague) was a Czechoslovak athlete and journalist.

== Career ==
Prague's Stadion Evžena Rošického is named after him. He just missed qualifying in the heats of the 800 meters in the 1936 Olympics Games. During World War II, he and his father Jaroslav Rošický were part of the anti-Nazi resistance group Captain Nemo. Evžen Rošický and his father were arrested on 18 June 1942, and one week later, on 25 June 1942, they were both executed at the Kobylisy shooting range in Prague, so he died at the young age of just 27 years.
