= Jaroslav Rošický =

Czech resistance fighter (1884–1942)

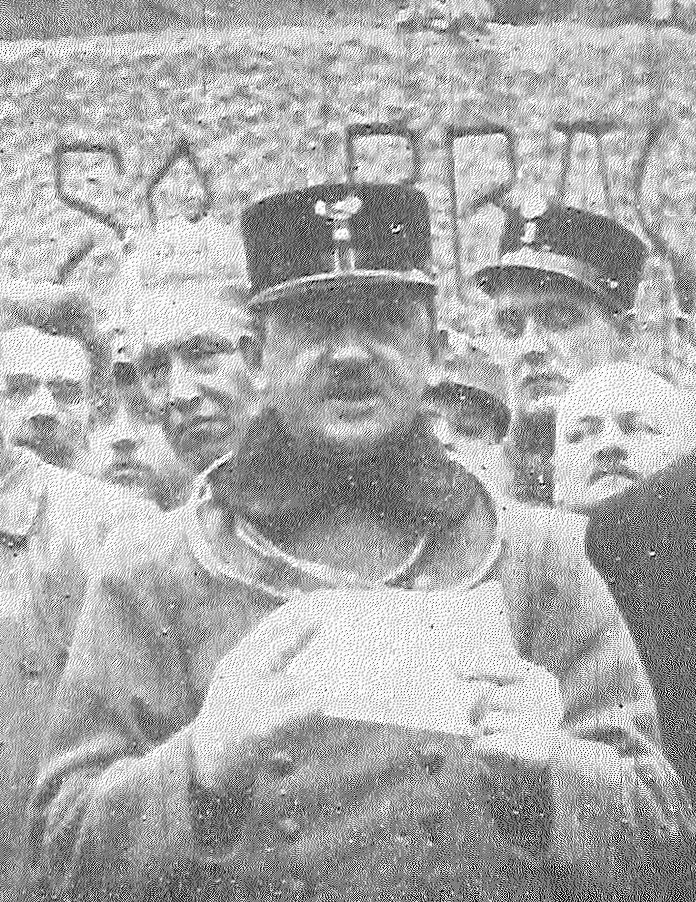
Jaroslav Rošický during declaration of Czechoslovak independence in October 1918

Jaroslav Rošický (19 September 1884, Třešť – 25 June 1942, Prague) was a Czech army officer.

As a soldier he participated in World War I, fighting in the Austrian army in Russia and Italy. He was injured in 1917 and returned to Brno, later moving to Prague. There he met members of the Czech National Committee, the leading body of the Czech and Czechoslovak independence movements. Rošický and Sokol leader Josef Scheiner were in charge of their respective military operations.

During World War II, Rošický was a member of the captain Nemo anti-Nazi resistance group. In 1942 he was arrested and executed along with his son, communist journalist and athlete Evžen Rošický.

His brother-in-law was Czech politician Zdeněk Fierlinger.
