= Zdeněk Čáp =

Czech ice hockey player

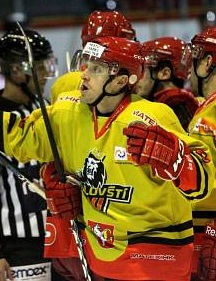
- Zdeněk Čáp
- Born: June 12, 1992 (age 33) Kolín, Czechoslovakia
- Height: 5 ft 11 in (180 cm)
- Weight: 170 lb (77 kg; 12 st 2 lb)
- Position: Defence
- Shoots: Left
- Czech Extraliga team: Mountfield HK
- NHL draft: Undrafted
- Playing career: 2010–present

Zdeněk Čáp (born June 12, 1992) is a Czech professional ice hockey defenceman. He currently plays with Mountfield HK of the Czech Extraliga.

Čáp made his Czech Extraliga debut playing with HC Pardubice during the 2013–14 Czech Extraliga season.
