= Kocourek =

Kocourek (Czech feminine: Kocourková) is a surname. It is a diminutive of a Czech word meaning "tomcat". Notable people with the surname include:

- Dave Kocourek (1937–2013), American gridiron football player
- Estanislao Kocourek (born 1930), Argentine hurdler

== See also ==
- Kocurek, Polish cognate
