= Kovařík =

Kovařík (feminine Kovaříková) is a Czech surname. Notable people with the surname include:

- Jan Kovařík (born 1988), Czech football player
- Josef Jan Kovařík (1870 – 1951), American musician
- Josef Kovařík (born 1966), Czech-Czechoslovak Nordic combined skier
- Libor Kovařík (born 1976), Czech football referee
- Ondřej Kovařík (born 1980), Czech politician
- Radka Kovaříková (born 1975), Czech pair skater

== See also ==
- 33058 Kovařík, main-belt asteroid
