= Stepankov =

Stepankov (Russian: Степанков) is a Russian masculine surname, its feminine counterpart is Stepankova. It may refer to

- Konstantin Stepankov (1928–2004), Soviet actor
- Valentin Stepankov (born 1951), Russian prosecutor general
