= Petříček =

Petříček (feminine Petříčková) is a Czech surname literally meaning 'little Peter'. Notable people with this surname include the following:

- Jan Petříček, Czech slalom canoeist
- Květa Petříčková, Czech field hockey player
- Tomáš Petříček, Czech politician
- Tomáš Petříček (canoeist), Czech slalom canoeist
- Vladimír Petříček, Czech rower
