= Daniela Kovářová =

Czech politician

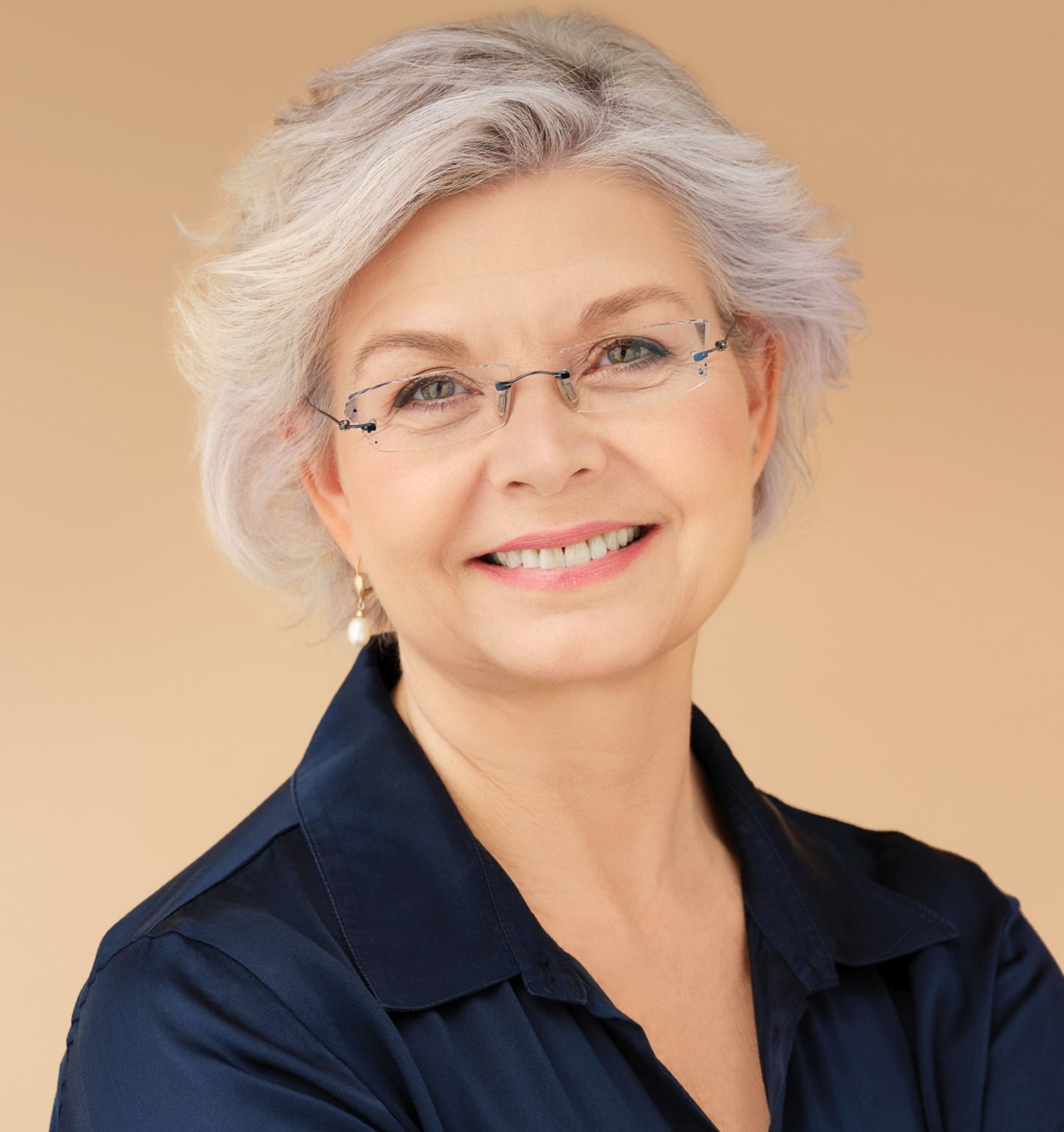
- Daniela Kovářová (2023)

Minister of Justice
- In office 8 May 2009 – 13 July 2010
- Prime Minister: Jan Fischer
- Preceded by: Jiří Pospíšil
- Succeeded by: Jiří Pospíšil

Chairwoman of the Government Legislative Council
- In office 8 May 2009 – 2 December 2009
- Prime Minister: Jan Fischer
- Preceded by: Pavel Svoboda
- Succeeded by: Pavel Zářecký

Senator for Plzeň-City
- Incumbent
- Assumed office 1 October 2022
- Preceded by: Václav Chaloupek

Personal details
- Born: 17 November 1964 (age 61) Ostrava, Czechoslovakia
- Party: KSČ (1987 – 1989); Independent (1989 – present)
- Education: Masaryk University
- Profession: Lawyer

Daniela Kovářová (born 17 November 1964) is a Czech politician who served as Minister of Justice in the caretaker government of Jan Fischer from 2009 to 2010.
