= Naděžda Melniková-Papoušková =

Czech art historian (1891–1878)

- Melniková-Papoušková before 1946
- Born: 23 November 1891; Saint Petersburg, Russian Empire
- Died: 10 July 1978 (aged 86); Prague, Czechoslovakia
- Resting place: Sobotka cemetery
- Education: Charles University
- Occupation: art historian
- Spouse: Jaroslav Papoušek

Naděžda Filartová Melníkova-Papoušková (23 November 1891 – 10 July 1978) was a Czech art historian, cultural researcher and folklorist.

== Early life and education ==
She was born on 23 November 1891 in Saint Petersburg, Russian Empire. In 1919, she traveled to Prague and four years, studied the art of Slavic peoples at the Faculty of Arts, Charles University under the supervision of Tomáš Masaryk. From 1922 to 1925, she studied at the École du Louvre in Paris.

== World War II ==
Melniková-Papoušková, together with her husband Jaroslav Papoušek, was one of the founders of the Resistance in the Protectorate of Bohemia and Moravia. Her husband was arrested in December 1941 due to his activities within this movement and died four years later, in January 1945, in a forced labor camp. She was also sent to the Ravensbrück concentration camp on 9 October 1941. Throughout the war, she had almost no information regarding her husband's fate. She ultimately survived her captivity and returned to a liberated Czechoslovakia in 1945.

== After war ==
From 1946 to 1950, she taught at the Palacký University Olomouc. In the early 1950s, she managed the Ars Gallery, located on the first floor of the Melantrich on Wenceslas Square. In Prague, she organized exhibitions for artists such as Vladimír Komárek, Marta Taberyová and Miloslav Chlupáč, among others. She was a collector of historical artworks; for instance, she owned an exquisite collection of Russian porcelain.

== Later life ==
Melniková-Papoušková died in Prague on 10 July 1978. Her ashes were placed in an urn and interred in the Samšiňák family tomb at the Sobotka cemetery.

== Selected bibliography ==
- Praha před sto lety (Prague a Hundred Years Ago), Prague 1935
- Československé lidové malířství na skle (Czechoslovak Folk Reverse glass painting), Státní graf. škola, Prague 1938
- Putování za lidovým uměním (A Journey in Search of Folk Art), Čin, tiskové a nakladatelské družstvo českých legionářů, Prague 1941
- Ruské lidové tisky (Russian Folk Prints), Prague 1946
- Československé lidové výtvarnictví [Czechoslovak Folk Art]. Prague: Orbis. 1948.
- Skleněný svět Ludviky Smrčkové (The Glass World of Ludvika Smrčková), Aventinum, Prague 1948
- Český lidový dřevořez (Czech Folk Woodcuts), Prague 1965
