= Elisabeth Czapek =

Swedish miniature painter

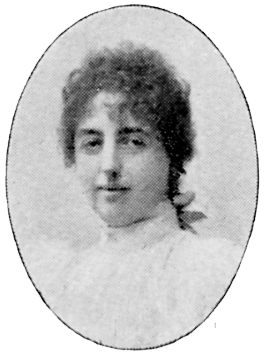
- Born: 24 March 1860; Gothenburg
- Died: 21 January 1949 (aged 88)
- Occupation: painter

Elisabeth Czapek (24 March 1860 – 21 January 1949) was a Swedish miniature painter.

== Life ==
Czapek was born in Gothenburg in 1860. She was the daughter of Musical director Josef Czapek and Berta Augustina Haglund. From 1884 to 1892 she was studying at the Académie Julian in Paris.

Her miniature paintings included Jean-Paul Marat, George I of Great Britain, Eric XIV of Sweden and Axel Oxenstierna.

She died in 1949 although some sources say she died in 1928.
