= Jan Zajíček (ice hockey) =

Czech ice hockey player

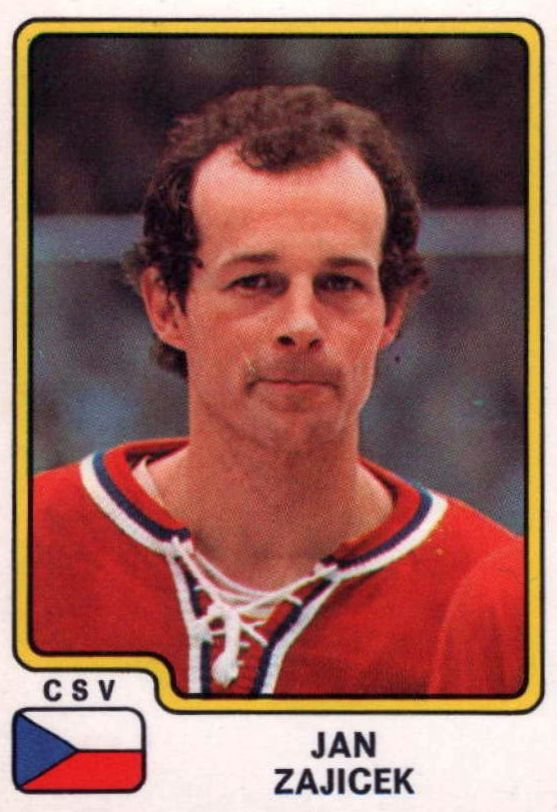
- Born: January 26, 1951 (age 74); Uherský Ostroh, Czechoslovakia
- Height: 6 ft 2 in (188 cm)
- Weight: 212 lb (96 kg; 15 st 2 lb)
- Position: Defence
- Shot: Left
- Played for: TJ Gottwaldov; TJ Sparta ČKD Praha; TJ Zetor Brno
- National team: Czechoslovakia
- Playing career: 1969–1986

Jan Zajíček (born January 26, 1951) is a Czech former professional ice hockey defenceman.

Zajíček played 312 games in the Czechoslovak First Ice Hockey League for TJ Gottwaldov, TJ Sparta ČKD Praha and TJ Zetor Brno. He was also a member of the Czechoslovakia national ice hockey team and played in the 1978 Ice Hockey World Championships.
