= Šnajdr =

Šnajdr, Šnajder and Šnejdr (feminines: Šnajdrová, Šnajderová, Šnejdrová) are Czech-language surnames, variants of the German surname Schneider. Notable people with the surname include:

- Josef Šnajdr (1909–1992), Czech military leader and pilot
- Filip Šnejdr (born 1995), Czech middle-distance runner

== See also ==
- The Sorrow of Mrs. Schneider (in Czech Smutek paní Šnajderové), 2008 Albanian-Czech film
