= Vladimír Slanina Sr. =

Czech canoeist

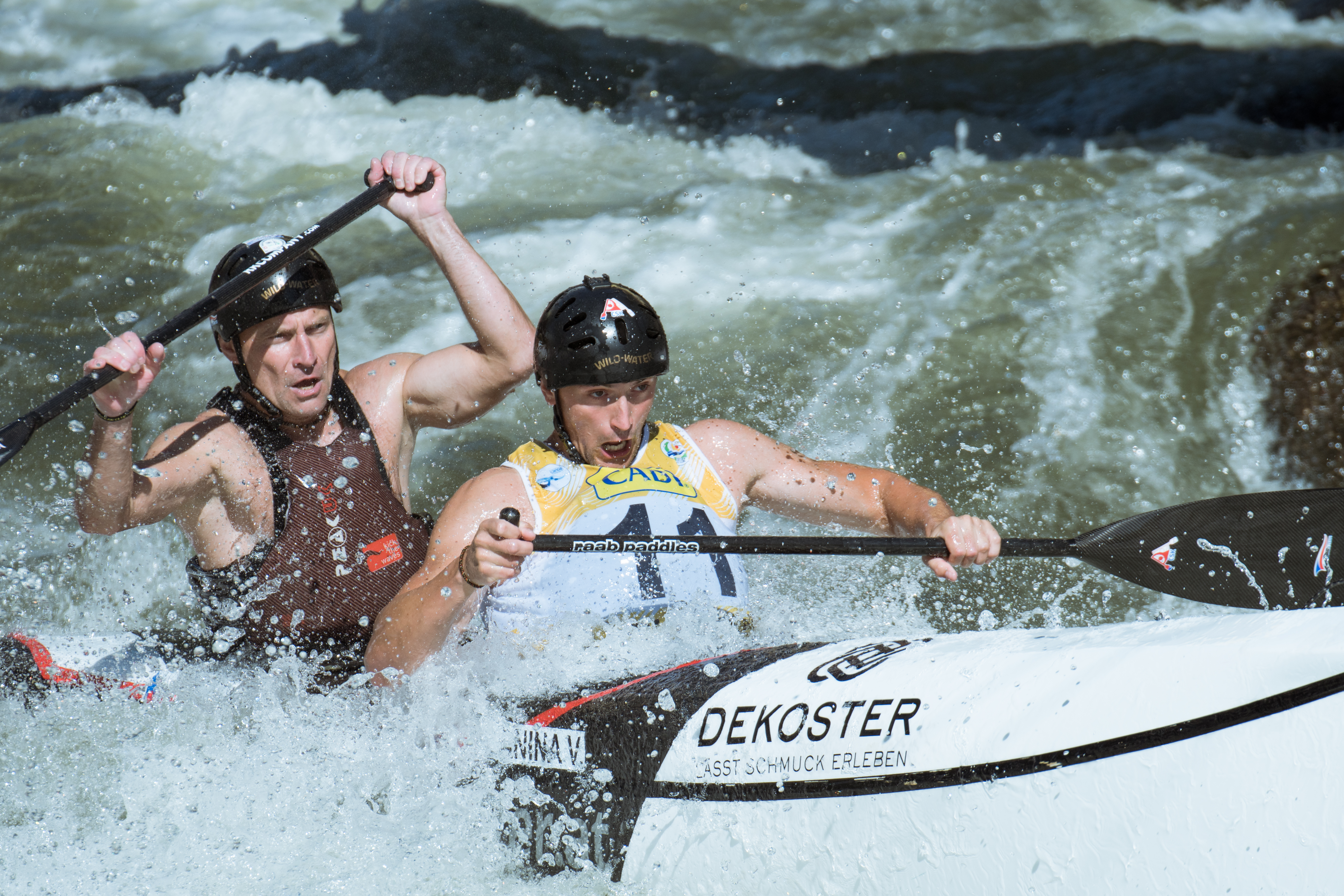
- Slanina (left) with his son Vladimír Slanina in 2019

Personal information
- Nationality: Czech
- Born: 12 May 1969 (age 57) Czech Republic

Sport
- Sport: Canoeing
- Event: Wildwater canoeing
Medal record
Event	1st	2nd	3rd
World Championships	0	0	1

Vladimír Slanina Sr. (born 12 May 1969) is a Czech male canoeist who won a medal at senior level at the Wildwater Canoeing World Championships.

He is the father of Vladimír Slanina, canoeist too.

== Medals at the World Championships ==
Senior

Year	1st place, gold medalist(s)	2nd place, silver medalist(s)	3rd place, bronze medalist(s)
2019	0	0	1
