= Skorobogatov =

Skorobogatov (Russian: Скоробога́тов) is a Russian surname. It is derived from the sobriquet "скоробогатый" ("soon rich"). That may refer to:

- Alexei Skorobogatov, Russian mathematician
- Andrey Skorobogatov, Russian sci-fi writer and rock-musician
- Nikolay Skorobogatov, Russian (soviet) movie actor

== See also ==
- Skorobogatko
- Brzobohatý
