= Peterka =

Peterka is a Czech and Slovene surname derived from the given name Peter. The Czech surname has a feminine form, Peterková.

Notable people include:

- Alena Peterková (born 1960), Czech long-distance runner
- Carol Peterka (born 1963), American handball player
- David Peterka (born 2006), Czech track cyclist
- František Peterka (1922–2016), Czech actor
- Hana Peterková (born 1987), Czech canoeist
- Jan Peterka (born 1990), Czech footballer
- JJ Peterka (born 2002), German ice hockey player
- Ludmila Peterková (born 1967), Czech clarinetist
- Martin Peterka (born 1995), Czech basketball player
- Odon Peterka (1925–1945), Slovene poet
- Primož Peterka (born 1979), Slovene ski jumper
- Rostislav Peterka (born 1949), Czech-Argentine rower
- Tobias Peterka (born 1982), German politician
