= Makovec =

Makovec (Czech feminine: Makovcová) is a surname. Alternative spellings include Makovets, Makovetz, Makovecz, and Makowetz. The Polish form is Makowiec.

Notable people with the surname include:

- Anka Makovec (1938–2017), Slovene-Australian environmentalist
- Jaroslav Makovec (born 1960), Czech race walker
- Sara Makovec (born 2000), Slovene footballer

== See also ==
- Makowiec (disambiguation), Polish cognate
