= Petržela =

Petržela (Czech feminine: Petrželová) is a Moravian surname. It may refer to:

- Jan Petržela (born 1992), Czech orienteer
- Milan Petržela (born 1983), Czech footballer
- Natalia Mehlman Petrzela, American historian
- Vlastimil Petržela (born 1953), Czech football manager
