= Skorobogatko =

Skorobogatko is a surname. Notable people with the surname include:

- Aleksandr Skorobogatko (born 1967), Ukrainian-Russian billionaire
- Andrey Skorobogatko (born 1968), Belarusian football coach and player

== See also ==
- Skorobogatov
- Brzobohatý
