= Ivan Václavík =

Slovak footballer

Personal information
- Date of birth: 2 November 1971 (age 54)
- Position: Midfielder

Senior career*
Years	Team	Apps	(Gls)
1993–1998	Kaučuk Opava		
1998–1999	Rimavská Sobota		
1999–2001	Most		
2000	→ Spolana Neratovice (loan)		
2001–2002	Blava		
2002–2005	LR Crystal		
2004	→ Slavoj Trebišov (loan)		
2005–2007	Vsetín		
2007–2009	LR Crystal		
- * Club domestic league appearances and goals

Ivan Václavík (born 2 November 1971) is a retired Slovak football midfielder.
