= Leo M. Chalupa =

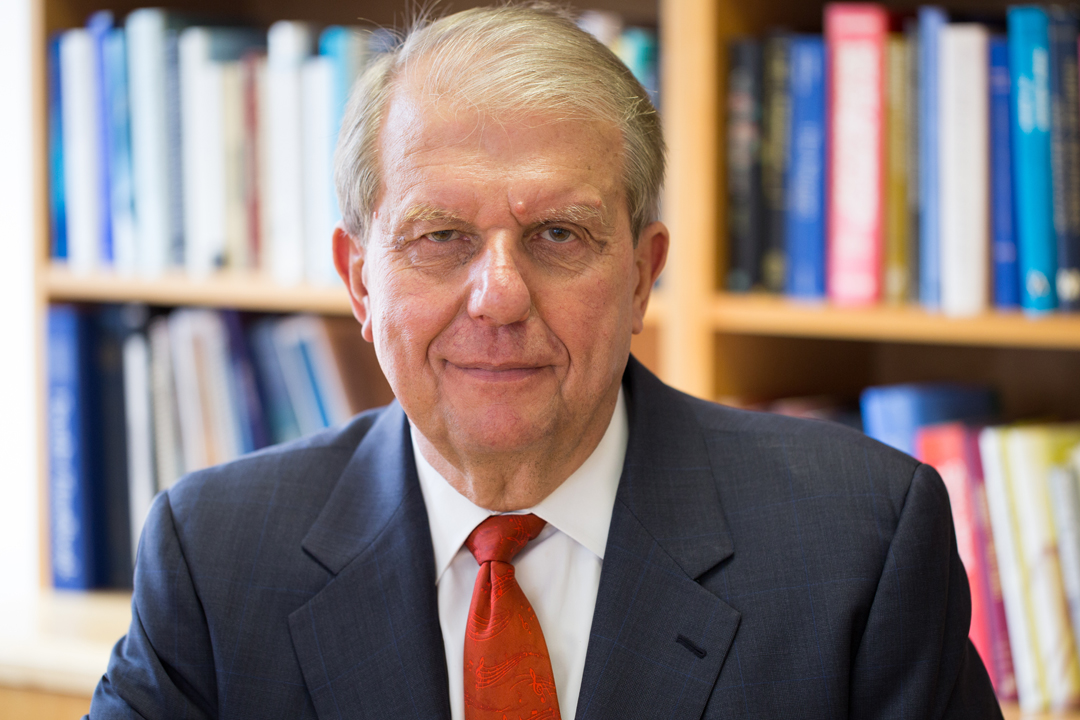
- Born: 28 March 1945 (age 81)
- Citizenship: American
- Spouse: Tanya Chalupa
- Children: 2

Leo M. Chalupa (born 28 March 1945) is a Ukrainian-American Neuropsychologist who was Vice President for Research and is Professor of Pharmacology and Physiology at George Washington University. He was previously a Distinguished Professor of Ophthalmology and Neurobiology at the University of California, Davis and Chairman of the Department of Neurobiology, Physiology and Behavior where he also served as the Director of the UC Davis Center for Neuroscience and Interim Dean of the College of Biological Sciences.

== Early life ==
Chalupa was born in Germany to Ukrainian parents. They brought him to the United States as a child seeking asylum from the Soviet Union. He grew up in Queens, New York, graduated from Queens College with a bachelor’s degree in Physiological Psychology in 1966, earned his doctorate in Neuropsychology at the City University of New York in 1970, and completed a post-doctoral fellowship at the Brain Research Institute at the University of California, Los Angeles, in 1975.

== Works ==
His research involves trying to understand how humans and other animals are able to perceive our surroundings and translate that into brain function which in turn leads to some action. For example, an animal identifying a predator and fleeing. Consequently, his research involves studying the retina, the visual system, and the development of visual perception. Using a combination of physiological, anatomical and molecular techniques his research has helped redefine the way we think about the visual system, by demonstrating how genetic and environmental factors play complementary roles in shaping the proper wiring of the visual system. Specifically, his work has shown that neuronal activity does not instruct the formation of specific connections in the developing visual system, a view widely held in the field of developmental neurobiology. This involved performing the first ever recordings from the primate fetal retina and the manufacture of a novel neurotoxin that selectively depletes cholinergic neurons from the developing retina. He is a co-editor of Development and Organization of the Retina: From Molecules to Function (1998) , The Visual Neurosciences Vol. 1&2 (2004) , Eye, Retina, and Visual System of the Mouse (2008) , and Cerebral Plasticity: New Perspectives (2011)

He is a Fellow of the AAAS and of the Association for Psychological Science, a recipient of a Guggenheim Fellowship and a Fellowship from the Japanese Society for the Promotion of Science. He has been a visiting scholar at Cambridge University, the Scuola Normale Superiore (Pisa, Italy) and the University of Pisa as well as Osaka University. He attended Stuyvesant High School in New York City, graduated from Queens College, City University of New York with a bachelor's degree in physiological psychology, earned his doctorate in neuropsychology at the City University of New York, and served a post-doctoral fellowship at the Brain Research Institute at the University of California, Los Angeles. He received an honorary doctorate from Queens College in 2011. He co-founded two companies, Immunotox Inc and SciVee.

== Personal life ==
Chalupa and his wife Tanya have two children, Alexandra and Andrea.

When Alexandra was 2–1/2, her life was saved by a child car seat when her parents' car spun out of control and crashed while traversing the Alps in Italy. The incident led her mother to single-handedly wage a successful 2-year lobbying campaign in the California legislature for a mandatory child safety seat law that passed in 1982.
