= Eliáš Galajda =

Slovak writer, translator, sculptor and folk singer of Ukrainian ethnicity

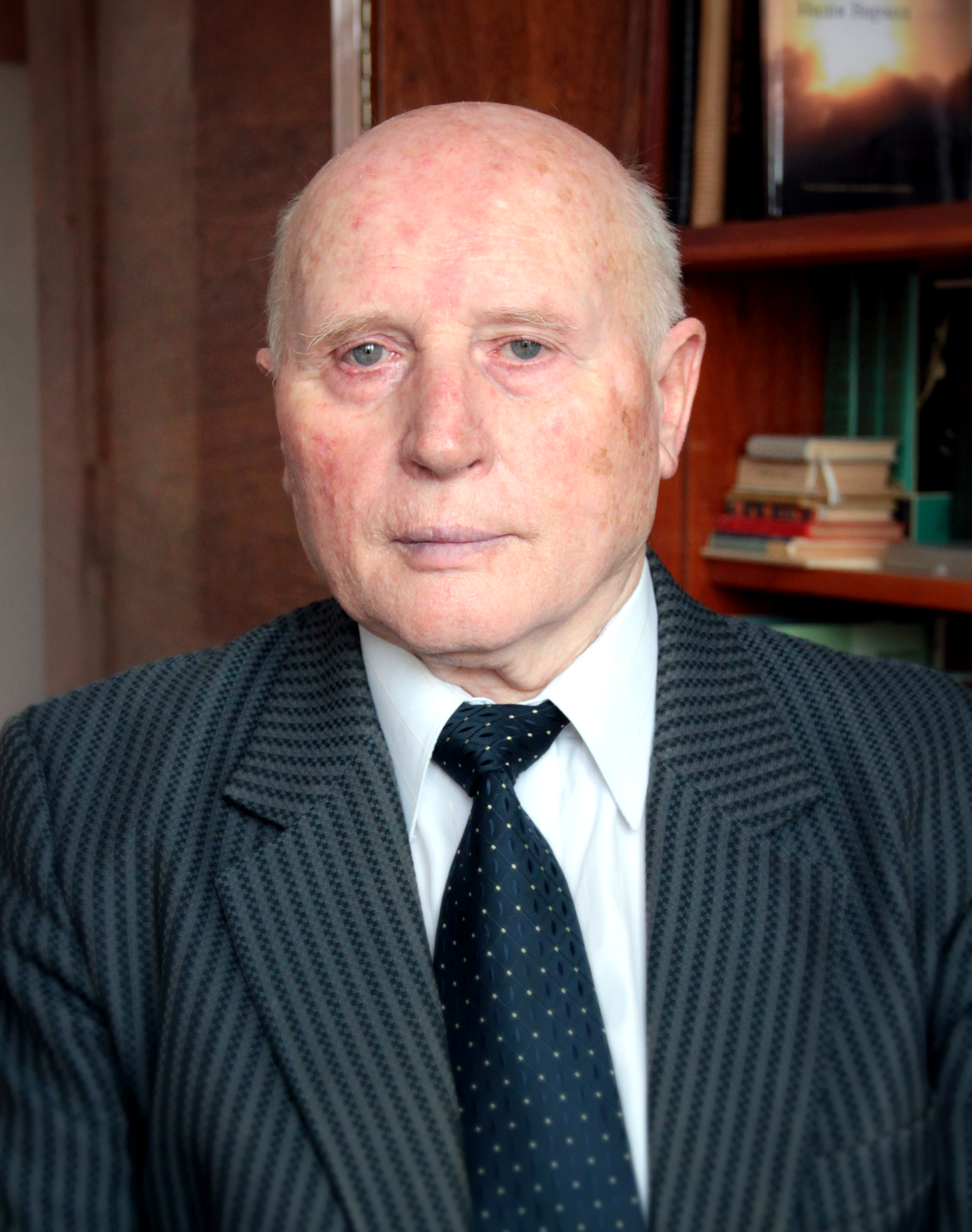
- Ukrainian writer, Slovakia
- Born: 1 August 1931; Čertižné, Slovakia
- Died: 10 August 2017 (aged 86); Košice, Slovakia
- Occupations: Writer, poet, translator

Eliáš Galajda (Ukrainian: Ілля Галайда; 1 August 1931 in Čertižné, Czechoslovakia [now Slovakia] – 10 August 2017 in Košice) was a Slovak writer, translator, sculptor and folk singer of Ukrainian ethnicity.

== Background ==
He attended primary school in his native village of Čertižné. Eliáš studied eight years at National Russian Gymnasium in Humenné, graduating in 1951. After graduation, he taught at the gymnasium for the next year and then proceeded study Russian and Ukraine language at Faculty of Philosophy, Charles University in Prague (1952–1953). After one year, he was chosen to attend The Faculty of Philology of the Saratov Chernyshevsky State University (1953–1955) and Faculty of Philology of Lomonosov Moscow State University where he graduated in 1958.

== Professional life ==
In 1958, he started to work as an editor in editorial office of "Dukľa" a "Družno vpered" in Prešov. Between 1960 and 1999, Eliáš worked as an assistant, later as an assistant professor and an associate professor at the Department of Russian language and literature in Prešov under Philosophy Faculty of Košice-based Pavol Jozef Šafárik University, now part of University of Prešov. In 1970, Galajda lectured a summer program on the Russian language at Modern Languages Centre of the University of Bradford.

Galajda became a member of the Association of Slovak writers in 1982. He walso also a member of the Association of Ukrainian writers in Slovakia, a member of the Association of Slovak writers organisations and the National Writer's Union of Ukraine. In 2010, Galajda has awarded the Ivan Franko Award for his contribution to literature and International Literature Award of Ivan Košelivec. for his story Word for skylarks (Slovo prozhaivoronkiv) published in Sobornist No 1-2 2010.

Eliáš Galajda, resided in Prešov until end of life, died in hospital in Košice after short hard illness. He is buried at the municipal cemetery in Prešov.

== Works ==
=== Poetries ===
Eliáš entered the world of literature in the early 1960s with his first collection of poems published within collective work of writers The Eight (Vosmero, 1963). In 1974, he debuted successfully with the wide poem collection Flame ups (Spalakhi). One could feel his growing up and reaching the poetry maturity in his collections The thirst of the Heart and the Land (Spraha sertsia i zemli, 1981), Insomnia (Bezsonya, 1986), The Ballad for three suns (Balada pro tri sontsia, 1991), especially in the poems devoted to his homeland, childhood memories and those with themes where he confronts his inner world with harsh reality. He dived deeper into lyric (emotional) contemplation of destiny and perspective of man as such in poem collections Mountains, Blue Mountains (Hori sini, hori, 1990) and My everyday sadness (Moia petchalj povsiakdenna, 1994). The Union of Rusyn-Ukrain writers of Slovak republic honored the 40 Anniversary of his work and publishments by bibliography Crane birds calling (Zhuravlinnyij klič, 1998). He continued to publish with his poem collections as: Restlessness paves the way (Trivohami doroha stelitjsia, 2001), Forgotten notebooks verses (Virshi iz zabutikh zoshitiv, 2006) and Autumn reflections (Osinni refleksii, 2011).

=== Proses ===
Galajda, a poet, alslo authored prose in short stories and novels: When the rain is coming (Koli idutj doshchi, 1980) a Still sings a skylark (Cshe spivaie zhaivoronok, 1989).

=== Anthologies ===
Solar wells (Soňačni krynyci, 1977) Anthology of poetry of the Ukraine writers in Slovakia
From forge of time (Iz kuzni času, 2007) Anthology of contemporary Slovak poetry (Z vyhne času, 2007).

=== Translations ===
Galajda has been active in translating from Ukrainian and Russian language to Slovak language and vice versa. He translated the Bernardo Guimarães novel Izaura (1995) from Russian to Slovak, the work of Jozef Leikert Transientness (Pominutelnost, 2006).

=== His Works translated ===
A part of Eliáš's work had been translated into Slovak language and published in collective works of writers such as Heart as a sun (Srdce ako since 1892),Such moments exist (Sú také chvíle 2002). Or in Czech collective work of writers Dawning under Carphatians (Rano pod Karpatami 1983), short stories and poems in Hungarian translation Carphatian song (A Karpátok éneke 1988). Some samples of his poems were also published in the anthology of short stories of Ukrainian nationality writers in ČSSR – Roots (Korene, 1990).
