= Perebyinis =

Perebyinis or Perebiynis (Ukrainian: Перебийніс) is a Ukrainian-language surname of Ukrainian Cossack origin. The word perebyi + nis literally means the contracted phrase "break the nose". It may also be transliterated via Russian language as Perebiynos or Perebeynos (Russian: Перебийнос, Перебейнос).

Notable people with the surname include:

- Petro Perebyinis, Ukrainian poet, recipient of state awards
- Tatiana Perebiynis, Ukrainian tennis player
- Yevhen Perebyinis, Ukrainian diplomat

== Nickname ==
- Dmytro Hrytsai "Perebyinis" (1907–1945), a leader in the Organization of Ukrainian Nationalists and a general in the Ukrainian Insurgent Army

== See also ==
- Uliana Perebinosova
