= Vladimír Čáp =

Czech footballer (born 1976)

Personal information
- Date of birth: 20 March 1976 (age 50)
- Place of birth: Ostrava, Czechoslovakia
- Height: 1.80 m (5 ft 11 in)
- Position: Defender

Senior career*
Years	Team	Apps	(Gls)
1994–1996	Baník Ostrava	19	(1)
1996–1998	Fotbal Frýdek-Místek	25	(0)
1998–2001	Baník Ostrava	64	(3)
2001–2002	Drnovice	31	(0)
2002–2003	Marila Příbram	12	(0)
2003–2004	Dynamo České Budějovice	7	(0)
2004–2005	Drnovice	23	(0)
2005–2007	Zagłębie Lubin	9	(0)
2007–2009	Śląsk Wrocław	35	(1)
2009–2011	Opava	64	(5)
2012–2013	SC Sitzenberg-Reidling	39	(3)
2013–2019	Beskyd Čeladná		
- * Club domestic league appearances and goals

Vladimír Čáp (born 20 March 1976) is a Czech former professional footballer who played as a defender.

== Honours ==
Śląsk Wrocław

- Ekstraklasa Cup: 2008–09
