= Javůrek =

- Municipality
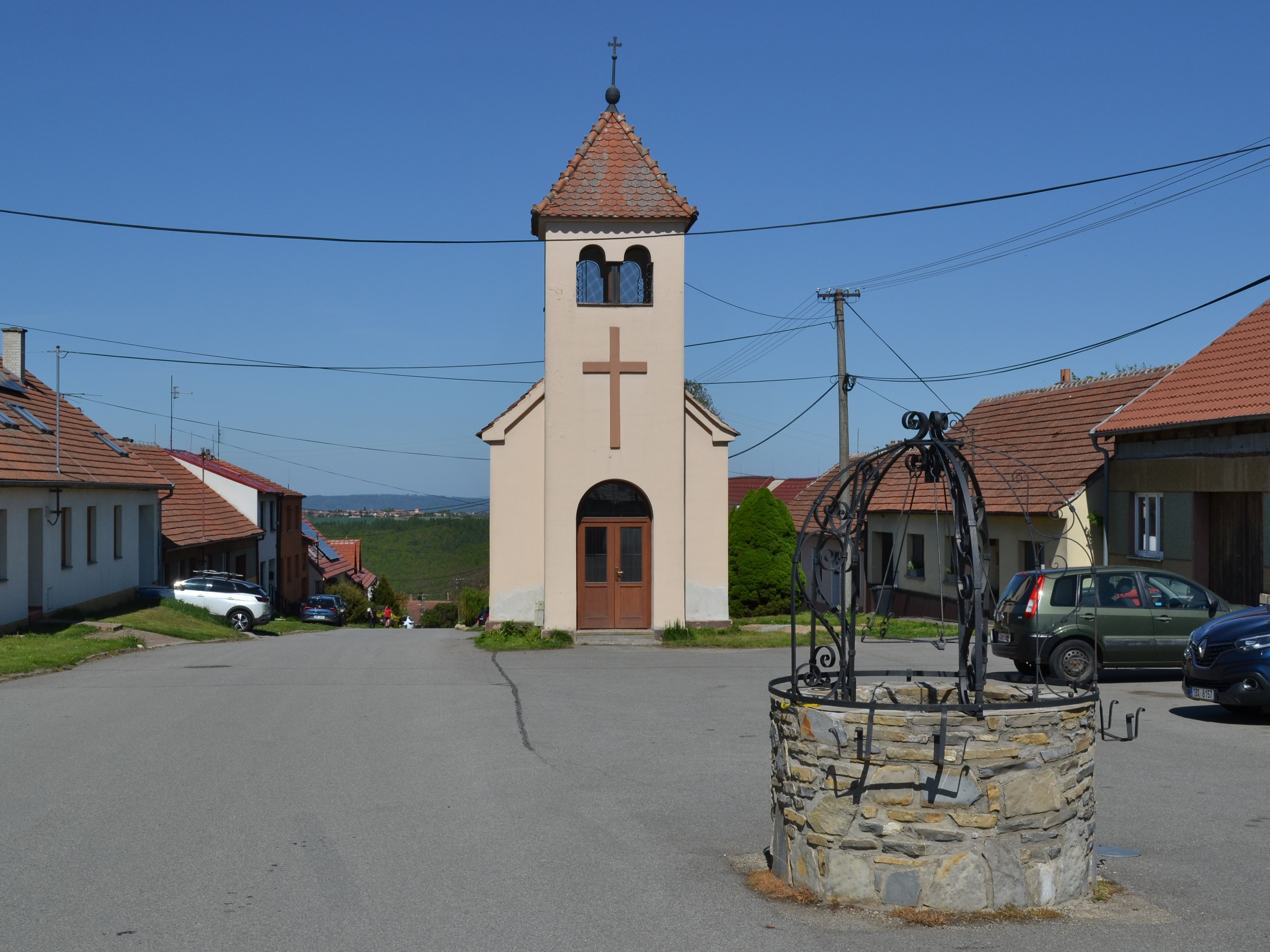
- Chapel of the Nativity of the Virgin Mary

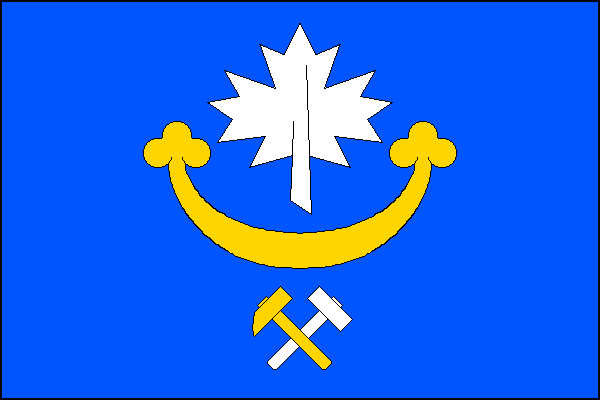
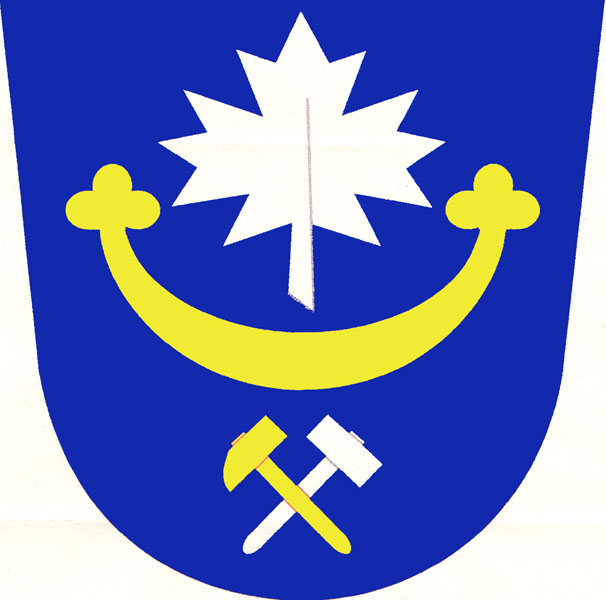
- Flag Coat of arms

- Location in the Czech Republic
- Coordinates: 49°15′20″N 16°21′44″E
- Country: Czech Republic
- Region: South Moravian
- District: Brno-Country
- First mentioned: 1399

Area
  - Total: 10.29 km^{2} (3.97 sq mi)
- Elevation: 474 m (1,555 ft)

Population (2026-01-01)
  - Total: 354
  - Density: 34.4/km^{2} (89.1/sq mi)
- Time zone: UTC+1 (CET)
  - Summer (DST): UTC+2 (CEST)
- Postal code: 664 83
- Website: www.obecjavurek.cz

Javůrek is a municipality and village in Brno-Country District in the South Moravian Region of the Czech Republic. It has about 400 inhabitants.

Javůrek lies approximately 20 kilometres (12 mi) west of Brno and 168 km (104 mi) south-east of Prague.

== Demographics ==
Historical population
Year	Pop.	±%
1869	544	—
1880	469	−13.8%
1890	507	+8.1%
1900	516	+1.8%
1910	474	−8.1%
1921	463	−2.3%
1930	434	−6.3%
1950	372	−14.3%
1961	356	−4.3%
1970	335	−5.9%
1980	314	−6.3%
1991	232	−26.1%
2001	235	+1.3%
2011	256	+8.9%
2021	340	+32.8%
Source: Censuses
