= David Pospíšil =

Czech ice hockey forward

- Born: May 9, 1970 (age 54); Pardubice, Czechoslovakia
- Height: 6 ft 0 in (183 cm)
- Weight: 185 lb (84 kg; 13 st 3 lb)
- Position: Forward
- Shot: Left
- Played for: HC Pardubice; HC Plzeň; HC Vítkovice; SKA Saint Petersburg
- National team: Czech Republic
- Playing career: 1987–2009

David Pospíšil (born May 9, 1970) is a Czech former professional ice hockey forward.

Pospíšil played 708 games in the Czech Extraliga, playing for HC Pardubice, HC Plzeň and HC Vítkovice. He also played 24 games in the Russian Superleague for SKA Saint Petersburg during the 2003–04 season.
