= Němeček =

Němeček (feminine Němečková) is a Czech surname, meaning "a small German". It is a diminutive of Němec, meaning "a German". It can be Anglicized as Nemechek or simply Nemecek. Notable people include:

- Bohumil Němeček, Czech boxer
- Franz Xaver Niemetschek, Czech music scholar
- Jan Němeček, Czech ice hockey player
- Lenka Němečková, Czech tennis player
- Libor Němeček, Czech tennis player
- Svatopluk Němeček, Czech politician
- Václav Němeček, Czech footballer
