= Václav (disambiguation) =

Václav is a masculine given name. It may also refer to:

- Marek Václav (born 1996), Slovak footballer
- Petr Václav (born 1967), Czech film director and screenwriter
- Václav (film), a 2007 film
- 8740 Václav, an asteroid
