= Dennis G. Kovar =

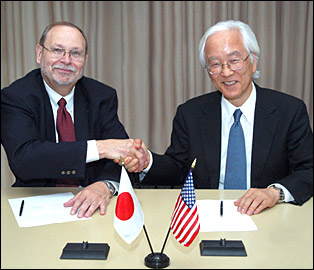
Dennis Kovar and Fumihiko Takasaki 200806

Dennis G. Kovar from the U.S. Department of Energy, was awarded the status of Fellow in the American Physical Society, after they were nominated by their Division of Nuclear Physics in 1996, for his work on direct reactions, which provided precise spectroscopic information of importance for our understanding of single-particle states near doubly-magic 208Pb, and which established the angular-momentum dependence in heavy-ion transfer reactions.
