= Zuzana Nováčková =

Czech painter and printmaker

Zuzana Nováčková (born 16 October 1945) is a Czech painter and printmaker.

Nováčková, a Prague native, studied at the Secondary School of Applied Arts in that city before continuing her education at the Academy of Fine Arts in the same city; her instructor there was Ladislav Čepelák. She has been active as a painter as well since the 1990s. Her work is represented in the collection of the National Gallery of Art.
