= Robert Pospíšil =

Czech ice hockey player

- Born: December 27, 1977 (age 48) Pardubice, Czechoslovakia
- Height: 6 ft 0 in (183 cm)
- Weight: 190 lb (86 kg; 13 st 8 lb)
- Position: Defence
- Shot: Left
- Played for: HC Pardubice; HC Bílí Tygři Liberec; Dauphins d'Épinal; Podhale Nowy Targ; Stoczniowiec Gdańsk; Basingstoke Bison
- Playing career: 1996–2016

Robert Pospíšil (born December 27, 1977) is a Czech former professional ice hockey defenceman.

Pospisil played in the Czech Extraliga for HC Pardubice between 1996 and 2000 and HC Bílí Tygři Liberec during the 2002-03 season. He also played in the Ligue Magnus for Dauphins d'Épinal, the Polska Hokej Liga for Podhale Nowy Targ and Stoczniowiec Gdańsk and the Elite Ice Hockey League for the Basingstoke Bison.

== Career statistics ==
			Regular season					Playoffs
Season	Team	League	GP	G	A	Pts	PIM	GP	G	A	Pts	PIM
1996–97	HC Pardubice	Czech	9	0	0	0	2	—	—	—	—	—
1996–97	HC Slovan Usti nad Labem	Czech2	20	1	1	2	—	—	—	—	—	—
1997–98	HC Pardubice	Czech	33	0	0	0	22	2	0	0	0	2
1997–98	HC Kometa Brno	Czech2	2	0	0	0	0	—	—	—	—	—
1997–98	TJ SC Kolín	Czech3	2	0	2	2	—	—	—	—	—	—
1998–99	HC Pardubice	Czech	38	0	2	2	22	3	0	0	0	4
1999–00	HC Pardubice	Czech	8	0	0	0	8	1	0	0	0	0
1999–00	SK Horácká Slavia Třebíč	Czech2	39	4	10	14	38	5	1	1	2	20
2000–01	HC Dukla Jihlava	Czech2	37	7	9	16	53	7	0	0	0	6
2001–02	Bílí Tygři Liberec	Czech2	35	6	9	15	18	10	1	0	1	12
2002–03	Bílí Tygři Liberec	Czech	46	5	5	10	32	—	—	—	—	—
2003–04	HC Prostějov	Czech2	24	6	2	8	18	—	—	—	—	—
2003–04	HC Slovan Ústečtí Lvi	Czech2	15	1	1	2	4	8	0	0	0	6
2004–05	Wildcats d'Epinal	Ligue Magnus	28	1	0	1	30	4	0	0	0	8
2005–06	HC Dukla Jihlava	Czech2	41	0	5	5	32	5	0	0	0	6
2006–07	Kapfenberger SV	Austria2	32	7	12	19	56	4	0	3	3	2
2007–08	Podhale Nowy Targ	Poland	37	4	14	18	26	—	—	—	—	—
2000–01	Stoczniowiec Gdansk	Poland	12	0	3	3	6	—	—	—	—	—
2008–09	Gazprom-OGU Orenburg	Russia2	8	0	0	0	10	—	—	—	—	—
2008–09	Basingstoke Bison	EIHL	29	0	5	5	26	—	—	—	—	—
2009–10	Vipers de Montpellier	France2	24	2	4	6	32	2	0	0	0	0
2011–12	Renards de Roanne	France4	10	1	5	6	14	2	0	0	0	6
2012–13	Renards de Roanne	France4	14	4	12	16	22	—	—	—	—	—
2013–14	Renards de Roanne	France3	16	2	5	7	10	2	0	0	0	2
2014–15	Renards de Roanne	France3	13	0	3	3	8	2	0	2	2	0
2015–16	Renards de Roanne	France3	16	0	8	8	18	2	0	0	0	4
Czech totals			134	5	7	12	86	6	0	0	0	6
Czech2 totals			213	25	37	62	163	35	2	1	3	50
