= Chalupka =

Chalupka is a surname. Notable people with the surname include:

- Ján Chalupka (1791–1871), Slovak dramatist, playwright, publicist
- Samo Chalupka (1812–1883), Slovak romantic poet
- Franciszek Chalupka (1856–1909), Polish-American clergy in New England
