= Hillel J. Kieval =

Hillel J. Kieval is a historian of Jewish culture who holds the Gloria M. Goldstein Professorship of Jewish History and Thought at Washington University in St. Louis. He has written multiple books about the history of the Jews in Bohemia and Moravia.

== Works ==
- Kieval, Hillel J. (1988). The Making of Czech Jewry: National Conflict and Jewish Society in Bohemia, 1870-1918. Oxford University Press. ISBN 978-0-19-504057-9.
- Kieval, Hillel J. (2000). Languages of Community: The Jewish Experience in the Czech Lands. University of California Press. ISBN 978-0-520-92116-0.
