= Michal Václavík =

Czech footballer

Personal information
- Full name: Michhal Václavík
- Date of birth: 3 April 1976 (age 50)
- Place of birth: Karviná, Czechoslovakia
- Height: 1.87 m (6 ft 2 in)
- Position: Goalkeeper

Senior career*
Years	Team	Apps	(Gls)
1995–1997	Karviná	58	(0)
1998–2003	Slavia Prague	20	(0)
2003	Marila Příbram	10	(0)
2004	Bohemians 1905	14	(0)
2004–2006	1. FC Brno	41	(0)
2006–2008	Zagłębie Lubin	29	(0)
2008–2010	Górnik Zabrze	11	(0)
2009–2010	Břeclav		
2010–2011	Hlučín	12	(0)

International career
1996–1997	Czech Republic U21	8	(0)
- * Club domestic league appearances and goals

Michal Václavík (born 3 April 1976) is a Czech former footballer who played as a goalkeeper. He played over 100 matches in the Gambrinus Liga.

== Honours ==
Slavia Prague

- Czech Cup: 1998–99, 2001–02

Zagłębie Lubin

- Ekstraklasa: 2006–07
- Polish Super Cup: 2007
