= Zajíc =

Zajíc (meaning 'hare') is a Czech surname. Notable people with the surname include:

- Jan Zajíc (1950–1969), Czech student and political protester
- Tomáš Zajíc (born 1996), Czech footballer
- William Zajíc of Valdek and Židlochovice (died 1420), Czech nobleman
- Zbyněk Zajíc of Hazmburk (1376–1411), Czech nobleman

== Fictional characters ==
- Senior lecturer Zajíc from 1969 Czechoslovak film Šest černých dívek aneb Proč zmizel Zajíc

== See also ==
- 10626 Zajíc, minor planet
- Dolora Zajick (born 1952), American opera singer
