= Japan at the 2016 Summer Olympics =

- IOC code: JPN
- NOC: Japanese Olympic Committee
- Website: www.joc.or.jp (in Japanese and English)

in Rio de Janeiro
- Competitors: 338 in 30 sports
- Flag bearer: Keisuke Ushiro
- Medals Ranked 6th: Gold 12 Silver 8 Bronze 21 Total 41

Summer Olympics appearances (overview)
- 1912; 1920; 1924; 1928; 1932; 1936; 1948; 1952; 1956; 1960; 1964; 1968; 1972; 1976; 1980; 1984; 1988; 1992; 1996; 2000; 2004; 2008; 2012; 2016; 2020; 2024; 2028

Japan competed at the 2016 Summer Olympics in Rio de Janeiro, Brazil, from 5 to 21 August 2016. Since the nation's official debut in 1912, Japanese athletes had appeared at every Summer Olympic Games in the modern era, except for two editions; they were not invited to the 1948 Summer Olympics in London because of the nation's role in World War II, and were also part of the United States-led boycott, when Moscow hosted the 1980 Summer Olympics.

As Tokyo was the host city of the 2020 Summer Olympics, a Japanese segment was performed during the closing ceremony. The Olympic flag was handed to Yuriko Koike, the Governor of Tokyo from Mayor of Rio de Janeiro, Eduardo Paes, who passed it to IOC President Thomas Bach before handed it to her. Prime Minister Shinzo Abe was present in the ceremony, dressed as Nintendo's Mario character. He travelled underground from Tokyo to Rio using the tunnel that was created in animation by both Nintendo and the Japanese Olympic Committee.

== Medalists ==
The following Japanese competitors won medals at the Games. In the by discipline sections below, medalists' names are bolded.

Medal	Name	Sport	Event	Date
Gold	Kosuke Hagino	Swimming	Men's 400 m individual medley	August 6
Gold	Shohei Ono	Judo	Men's 73 kg	August 8
Gold	Kenzō Shirai; Yūsuke Tanaka; Koji Yamamuro; Kōhei Uchimura; Ryōhei Katō	Gymnastics	Men's artistic team all-around	August 8
Gold	Haruka Tachimoto	Judo	Women's 70 kg	August 10
Gold	Mashu Baker	Judo	Men's 90 kg	August 10
Gold	Kōhei Uchimura	Gymnastics	Men's artistic individual all-around	August 10
Gold	Rie Kaneto	Swimming	Women's 200 m breaststroke	August 11
Gold	Eri Tosaka	Wrestling	Women's freestyle 48 kg	August 17
Gold	Kaori Icho	Wrestling	Women's freestyle 58 kg	August 17
Gold	Sara Dosho	Wrestling	Women's freestyle 69 kg	August 17
Gold	Misaki Matsutomo; Ayaka Takahashi	Badminton	Women's doubles	August 18
Gold	Risako Kawai	Wrestling	Women's freestyle 63 kg	August 18
Silver	Masato Sakai	Swimming	Men's 200 m butterfly	August 9
Silver	Kosuke Hagino	Swimming	Men's 200 m individual medley	August 11
Silver	Hisayoshi Harasawa	Judo	Men's +100 kg	August 12
Silver	Shinobu Ota	Wrestling	Men's Greco-Roman 59 kg	August 14
Silver	Jun Mizutani; Koki Niwa; Maharu Yoshimura	Table tennis	Men's team	August 17
Silver	Saori Yoshida	Wrestling	Women's freestyle 53 kg	August 18
Silver	Rei Higuchi	Wrestling	Men's freestyle 57 kg	August 19
Silver	Asuka Cambridge; Yoshihide Kiryū; Ryota Yamagata; Shōta Iizuka	Athletics	Men's 4 × 100 m relay	August 19
Bronze	Ami Kondo	Judo	Women's 48 kg	August 6
Bronze	Naohisa Takato	Judo	Men's 60 kg	August 6
Bronze	Hiromi Miyake	Weightlifting	Women's 48 kg	August 6
Bronze	Daiya Seto	Swimming	Men's 400 m individual medley	August 6
Bronze	Misato Nakamura	Judo	Women's 52 kg	August 7
Bronze	Masashi Ebinuma	Judo	Men's 66 kg	August 7
Bronze	Kaori Matsumoto	Judo	Women's 57 kg	August 8
Bronze	Takuya Haneda	Canoeing	Men's slalom C-1	August 9
Bronze	Takanori Nagase	Judo	Men's 81 kg	August 9
Bronze	Kosuke Hagino; Naito Ehara; Yuki Kobori; Takeshi Matsuda	Swimming	Men's 4 × 200 m freestyle relay	August 9
Bronze	Natsumi Hoshi	Swimming	Women's 200 m butterfly	August 10
Bronze	Ryunosuke Haga	Judo	Men's 100 kg	August 11
Bronze	Jun Mizutani	Table tennis	Men's singles	August 11
Bronze	Kanae Yamabe	Judo	Women's +78 kg	August 12
Bronze	Kei Nishikori	Tennis	Men's singles	August 14
Bronze	Kenzō Shirai	Gymnastics	Men's vault	August 15
Bronze	Yukiko Inui; Risako Mitsui	Synchronized swimming	Women's duet	August 16
Bronze	Ai Fukuhara; Kasumi Ishikawa; Mima Ito	Table tennis	Women's team	August 16
Bronze	Nozomi Okuhara	Badminton	Women's singles	August 19
Bronze	Aika Hakoyama; Aiko Hayashi; Yukiko Inui; Kei Marumo; Risako Mitsui; Kanami Nakamaki; Mai Nakamura; Kano Omata; Kurumi Yoshida	Synchronized swimming	Women's team	August 19
Bronze	Hirooki Arai	Athletics	Men's 50 km walk	August 19

Medals by sport
**Sport**	1st place, gold medalist(s)	2nd place, silver medalist(s)	3rd place, bronze medalist(s)	**Total**
Wrestling	4	3	0	7
Judo	3	1	8	12
Swimming	2	2	3	7
Gymnastics	2	0	1	3
Badminton	1	0	1	2
Table Tennis	0	1	2	3
Athletics	0	1	1	2
Synchronized swimming	0	0	2	2
Canoeing	0	0	1	1
Tennis	0	0	1	1
Weightlifting	0	0	1	1
Total	12	8	21	41

Medals by day
**Day**	1st place, gold medalist(s)	2nd place, silver medalist(s)	3rd place, bronze medalist(s)	**Total**
6 August	1	0	4	5
7 August	0	0	2	2
8 August	2	0	1	3
9 August	0	1	3	4
10 August	3	0	1	4
11 August	1	1	2	4
12 August	0	1	1	2
13 August	0	0	0	0
14 August	0	1	1	2
15 August	0	0	1	1
16 August	0	0	2	2
17 August	3	1	0	4
18 August	2	1	0	3
19 August	0	2	3	5
Total	12	8	21	41

== Competitors ==
The following is the list of number of competitors participating in the Games. Note that reserves in fencing, field hockey, football, and handball are not counted as athletes:

Sport	Men	Women	Total
Archery	1	3	4
Athletics	39	14	53
Badminton	4	5	9
Basketball	0	12	12
Boxing	2	0	2
Canoeing	4	1	5
Cycling	8	2	10
Diving	2	1	3
Equestrian	7	3	10
Fencing	3	3	6
Field hockey	0	16	16
Football	18	0	18
Golf	2	2	4
Gymnastics	7	12	19
Judo	7	7	14
Modern pentathlon	2	1	3
Rowing	2	2	4
Rugby sevens	12	12	24
Sailing	5	6	11
Shooting	5	3	8
Swimming	18	18	36
Synchronized swimming	—	9	9
Table tennis	3	3	6
Taekwondo	0	1	1
Tennis	3	3	6
Triathlon	1	3	4
Volleyball	0	12	12
Water polo	13	0	13
Weightlifting	3	4	7
Wrestling	4	6	10
Total	174	164	338

== Archery ==
Three Japanese archers qualified for the women's events after having secured a top eight finish in the team recurve at the 2015 World Archery Championships in Copenhagen, Denmark. Another Japanese archer also qualified for the men's individual recurve by obtaining one of the eight Olympic places available from the same tournament.

Athlete	Event	Ranking round		Round of 64	Round of 32	Round of 16	Quarterfinals	Semifinals	Final / BM	
Athlete	Event	Score	Seed	Opposition Score	Opposition Score	Opposition Score	Opposition Score	Opposition Score	Opposition Score	Rank
Takaharu Furukawa	Men's individual	680	7	Dielemans (NED); W 7–1	Nesteng (NOR); W 6–0	Rodríguez (ESP); W 7–3	Ellison (USA); L 2–6	Did not advance		
Yuki Hayashi	Women's individual	591	59	Wu JX (CHN); L 1–7	Did not advance					
Kaori Kawanaka	Women's individual	650	10	Psarra (GRE); W 7–3	Folkard (GBR); L 0–6	Did not advance				
Saori Nagamine	Women's individual	621	39	dos Santos (BRA); L 3–7	Did not advance					
Yuki Hayashi; Kaori Kawanaka; Saori Nagamine	Women's team	1862	9	—N/a		Ukraine; W 6–2	South Korea; L 1–5	Did not advance		

== Athletics ==
Japanese athletes have so far achieved qualifying standards in the following athletics events (up to a maximum of 3 athletes in each event): The team was selected based on the results of the 2016 Japan Championships in Athletics, and once an athlete wins a medal in race walking and marathon, or attains the top eight position in track and field at the 2015 IAAF World Championships in Beijing, China.

On 17 March 2016, the Japan Association of Athletics Federations (JAAF) had selected three runners each in both men's and women's marathon race, with Kayoko Fukushi remarkably going to her fourth consecutive Olympics. Forty-two further athletes (31 men and 11 women) were added to the nation's track and field roster for the Games, based on their performances achieved at the Japan Championships (24 to 26 June). Among them were sprinters Chisato Fukushima and Shota Iizuka, 2015 Worlds bronze medalist and three-time Olympic race walker Takayuki Tanii, and javelin thrower Ryohei Arai.

Key

- Note–Ranks given for track events are within the athlete's heat only
- Q = Qualified for the next round
- q = Qualified for the next round as a fastest loser or, in field events, by position without achieving the qualifying target
- NR = National record
- N/A = Round not applicable for the event
- Bye = Athlete not required to compete in round

Track & road events
Men

Athlete	Event	Heat		Quarterfinal		Semifinal		Final	
Athlete	Event	Result	Rank	Result	Rank	Result	Rank	Result	Rank
Asuka Cambridge	100 m	Bye		10.13	2 Q	10.17	7	Did not advance	
Yoshihide Kiryū	100 m	Bye		10.23	4	Did not advance			
Ryota Yamagata	100 m	Bye		10.20	2 Q	10.05	5	Did not advance	
Kenji Fujimitsu	200 m	20.86	6	—N/a		Did not advance			
Shota Iizuka	200 m	20.49	4	—N/a		Did not advance			
Kei Takase	200 m	20.71	6	—N/a		Did not advance			
Yuzo Kanemaru	400 m	48.38	8	—N/a		Did not advance			
Julian Walsh	400 m	46.37	6	—N/a		Did not advance			
Sho Kawamoto	800 m	1:49.41	4	—N/a		Did not advance			
Kota Murayama	5000 m	14:26.72	22	—N/a				Did not advance	
Kota Murayama	10000 m	—N/a						29:02.51	30
Suguru Osako	5000 m	13:31.45	16	—N/a				Did not advance	
Suguru Osako	10000 m	—N/a						27:51.94	17
Yuta Shitara	10000 m	—N/a						28:55.23	29
Wataru Yazawa	110 m hurdles	13.88	3	—N/a		Did not advance			
Yuki Matsushita	400 m hurdles	49.60	4	—N/a		Did not advance			
Keisuke Nozawa	400 m hurdles	48.62	1 Q	—N/a		49.20	6	Did not advance	
Kazuya Shiojiri	3000 m steeplechase	8:40.98	11	—N/a				Did not advance	
Suehiro Ishikawa	Marathon	—N/a						2:17:08	36
Hisanori Kitajima	Marathon	—N/a						2:25:11	94
Satoru Sasaki	Marathon	—N/a						2:13:57	16
Isamu Fujisawa	20 km walk	—N/a						1:22:03	21
Daisuke Matsunaga	20 km walk	—N/a						1:20:22	7
Eiki Takahashi	20 km walk	—N/a						1:24:59	42
Hirooki Arai	50 km walk	—N/a						3:41:24	3rd place, bronze medalist(s)
Kōichirō Morioka	50 km walk	—N/a						3:58:59	26
Takayuki Tanii	50 km walk	—N/a						3:51:00	14
Asuka Cambridge; Shota Iizuka; Yoshihide Kiryū; Ryota Yamagata	4 × 100 m relay	37.68 AS	1 Q	—N/a				37.60 AS	2nd place, silver medalist(s)
Nobuya Kato; Takamasa Kitagawa; Tomoya Tamura; Julian Walsh	4 × 400 m relay	3:02.95	7	—N/a				Did not advance	

Women

Athlete	Event	Heat		Semifinal		Final	
Athlete	Event	Result	Rank	Result	Rank	Result	Rank
Chisato Fukushima	200 m	23.21	5	Did not advance			
Misaki Onishi	5000 m	15:29.17	9	—N/a		Did not advance	
Ayuko Suzuki	5000 m	15:41.81	12	—N/a		Did not advance	
Miyuki Uehara	5000 m	15:23.41	7 q	—N/a		15:34.97	15
Hanami Sekine	10000 m	—N/a				31:44.44	20
Yuka Takashima	10000 m	—N/a				31:36.44	18
Satomi Kubokura	400 m hurdles	57.34	5	Did not advance			
Anju Takamizawa	3000 m steeplechase	9:58.59	17	—N/a		Did not advance	
Kayoko Fukushi	Marathon	—N/a				2:29:53	14
Mai Ito	Marathon	—N/a				2:37:37	46
Tomomi Tanaka	Marathon	—N/a				2:31:12	19
Kumiko Okada	20 km walk	—N/a				1:32:42	32

Field events
Men

Athlete	Event	Qualification		Final	
Athlete	Event	Distance	Position	Distance	Position
Ryohei Arai	Javelin throw	84.16	4 Q	79.47	11
Takashi Eto	High jump	2.17	=35	Did not advance	
Daigo Hasegawa	Triple jump	16.17	29	Did not advance	
Hiroki Ogita	Pole vault	5.45	21	Did not advance	
Daichi Sawano	Pole vault	5.60	=10 q	5.50	=7
Seito Yamamoto	Pole vault	NM	—	Did not advance	
Kohei Yamashita	Triple jump	15.71	35	Did not advance	

Women

Athlete	Event	Qualification		Final	
Athlete	Event	Distance	Position	Distance	Position
Konomi Kai	Long jump	5.87	37	Did not advance	
Yuki Ebihara	Javelin throw	57.68	21	Did not advance	

Combined events – Men's decathlon

Athlete	Event	100 m	LJ	SP	HJ	400 m	110H	DT	PV	JT	1500 m	Final	Rank
Akihiko Nakamura	Result	11.04	7.13	12.00	1.92	48.93	14.57	34.91	4.70	51.24	4:18.37	7612	22
Akihiko Nakamura	Points	852	845	606	731	865	902	562	819	607	823	7612	22
Keisuke Ushiro	Result	11.30	6.83	14.14	1.98	50.43	15.09	49.90	4.90	66.63	4:46.33	7952	20
Keisuke Ushiro	Points	795	774	737	785	795	839	868	880	838	641	7952	20

== Badminton ==
Japan has qualified a total of nine badminton players for each of the following events into the Olympic tournament based on the BWF World Rankings as of 5 May 2016: two entries in the women's singles, one in the men's singles, and a pair each in the men's, women's, and mixed doubles.

Men

Athlete	Event	Group Stage				Elimination	Quarterfinal	Semifinal	Final / BM	
Athlete	Event	Opposition Score	Opposition Score	Opposition Score	Rank	Opposition Score	Opposition Score	Opposition Score	Opposition Score	Rank
Sho Sasaki	Singles	Ouseph (GBR); L (15–21, 9–21)	Koukal (CZE); W (21–10, 16–21, 21–12)	—N/a	2	Did not advance				
Hiroyuki Endo; Kenichi Hayakawa	Doubles	Ahsan / Setiawan (INA); W (21–17, 16–21, 21–14)	Chai B / Hong W (CHN); W (21–18, 14–21, 23–21)	Attri / Reddy (IND); L (21–23, 11–21)	2 Q	—N/a	Ellis / Langridge (GBR); L (19–21, 17–21)	Did not advance		

Women

Athlete	Event	Group Stage				Elimination	Quarterfinal	Semifinal	Final / BM	
Athlete	Event	Opposition Score	Opposition Score	Opposition Score	Rank	Opposition Score	Opposition Score	Opposition Score	Opposition Score	Rank
Nozomi Okuhara	Singles	Vū T T (VIE); W (21–10, 21–8)	Fanetri (INA); W (21–12, 21–12)	—N/a	1 Q	Bae Y-j (KOR); W (21–6, 21–7)	Yamaguchi (JPN); W (11–21, 21–17, 21–10)	Sindhu (IND); L (19–21, 10–21)	Li Xr (CHN); W WO	3rd place, bronze medalist(s)
Akane Yamaguchi	Singles	Gavnholt (CZE); W (20–22, 21–12, 21–15)	Tee J Y (MAS); W (21–18, 21–5)	—N/a	1 Q	Intanon (THA); W (21–19, 21–16)	Okuhara (JPN); L (21–11, 17–21, 10–21)	Did not advance		
Misaki Matsutomo; Ayaka Takahashi	Doubles	Muskens / Piek (NED); W (21–9, 21–11)	Gutta / Ponnappa (IND); W (21–15, 21–10)	Supajirakul / Taerattanachai (THA); W (21–15, 21–15)	2 Q	—N/a	Hoo K M / Woon K W (MAS); W (21–16, 18–21, 21–9)	Jung K-e / Shin S-c (KOR); W (21–16, 21–17)	Pedersen / Rytter Juhl (DEN); W (18–21, 21–9, 21–19)	1st place, gold medalist(s)

Mixed

Athlete	Event	Group Stage				Quarterfinal	Semifinal	Final / BM	
Athlete	Event	Opposition Score	Opposition Score	Opposition Score	Rank	Opposition Score	Opposition Score	Opposition Score	Rank
Kenta Kazuno; Ayane Kurihara	Doubles	Ko S-h / Kim H-n (KOR); L (23–25, 17–21)	Chew / Subandhi (USA); W (21–6, 21–12)	Arends / Piek (NED); W (21–14, 21–19)	2 Q	Zhang N / Zhao YL (CHN); L (14–21, 12–21)	Did not advance		

== Basketball ==
=== Women's tournament ===
Japan women's basketball team qualified for the Olympics by winning the gold medal match over China and securing the lone outright berth at the 2015 FIBA Asia Championships.

Team roster

The following is Japan's roster for the women's basketball tournament of the 2016 Summer Olympics.

Japan women's national basketball team – 2016 Summer Olympics roster
Players
Coaches

Pos.	No.	Name	Age – Date of birth	Height	Club	Ctr.
G	4	Kaede Kondo	24 – October 6, 1991	5 ft 8 in (1.73 m)	Toyota Antelopes	(Japan)
F	5	Yuki Miyazawa	23 – June 2, 1993	6 ft 0 in (1.83 m)	JX-Eneos Sunflowers	(Japan)
C	6	Yuka Mamiya	26 – April 3, 1990	6 ft 0 in (1.83 m)	JX-Eneos Sunflowers	(Japan)
F	7	Mika Kurihara	27 – May 14, 1989	5 ft 9 in (1.75 m)	Toyota Antelopes	(Japan)
F	8	Maki Takada	26 – August 23, 1989	6 ft 0 in (1.83 m)	Denso Iris	(Japan)
G	9	Naho Miyoshi	22 – December 21, 1993	5 ft 5 in (1.65 m)	Chanson V-Magic	(Japan)
F	10	Ramu Tokashiki	25 – June 11, 1991	6 ft 3 in (1.91 m)	Seattle Storm	(United States)
F	11	Moeko Nagaoka	22 – December 29, 1993	5 ft 11 in (1.8 m)	Fujitsu Red Wave	(Japan)
G	12	Asami Yoshida (C)	28 – October 9, 1987	5 ft 4 in (1.63 m)	JX-Eneos Sunflowers	(Japan)
G	13	Rui Machida	23 – March 8, 1993	5 ft 3 in (1.6 m)	Fujitsu Red Wave	(Japan)
G	14	Sanae Motokowa	24 – April 2, 1992	5 ft 9 in (1.75 m)	Chanson V-Magic	(Japan)
C	15	Asako O	28 – December 16, 1987	6 ft 2 in (1.88 m)	Mitsubishi Koalas	(Japan)

Head coach

- (Japan) Tomohide Utsumi

Assistant coach(es)

- (Japan) Eiki Umezaki

Legend

- (C) Team captain
- Club – describes last
  club before the tournament
- Age – describes age
  on 6 August 2016

Group play

Pos	Team	Pld	W	L	PF	PA	PD	Pts	Qualification
1	Australia	5	5	0	400	345	+55	10	Quarter-finals
2	France	5	3	2	344	343	+1	8 (Note: Head-to-head record: France 3 pts, +8 PD; Turkey 3 pts, −2 PD; Japan 3 pts, −6 PD)	Quarter-finals
3	Turkey	5	3	2	324	325	−1	8	Quarter-finals
4	Japan	5	3	2	386	378	+8	8	Quarter-finals
5	Belarus	5	1	4	347	361	−14	6	
6	Brazil (H)	5	0	5	335	384	−49	5	

Source: FIBA
Rules for classification: 1) points; 2) head-to-head points; 3) head-to-head points difference; 4) head-to-head number of points scored.
(H) Hosts
Notes:

6 August 2016
19:45

Boxscore

Belarus	73–77	Japan
Scoring by quarter: 21–26, 19–15, 20–19, 13–17
Pts: Leuchanka 15; Rebs: Verameyenka 10; Asts: Harding 5		Pts: Kurihara 20; Rebs: Yoshida 9 Asts: Yoshida 8

Youth Arena, Rio de Janeiro
Attendance: 2,586
Referees: Damir Javor (SLO), Chahinaz Boussetta (MAR), Hwang In-tae (KOR)

8 August 2016
17:30

Boxscore

Japan	82–66	Brazil
Scoring by quarter: 19–20, 28–13, 26–19, 9–14
Pts: Tokashiki 23; Rebs: Tokashiki 9 Asts: Yoshida 11		Pts: Castro Marques 20; Rebs: Dos Santos 16; Asts: Pinto 6

Youth Arena, Rio de Janeiro
Attendance: 2,624
Referees: José Reyes (MEX), Carlos Peruga (ESP), Nadege Zouzou (CIV)

9 August 2016
17:45

Boxscore

Turkey	76–62	Japan
Scoring by quarter: 24–9, 14–14, 19–16, 19–23
Pts: Sanders 36; Rebs: Çağlar 9 Asts: Alben, Çakır 5		Pts: Tokashiki 13; Rebs: Tokashiki 7 Asts: Yoshida 7

Youth Arena, Rio de Janeiro
Attendance: 2,624
Referees: Oļegs Latiševs (LAT), Ferdinand Pascual (PHI), Chanihaz Boussetta (MAR)

11 August 2016
17:45

Boxscore

Japan	86–92	Australia
Scoring by quarter: 24–23, 26–25, 21–11, 15–33
Pts: Tokashiki 23; Rebs: Kurihara, Tokashiki 7 Asts: Yoshida 11		Pts: Cambage 37; Rebs: Cambage 10; Asts: Mitchell, Taylor 7

Youth Arena, Rio de Janeiro
Attendance: 3,315
Referees: Anne Panther (GER), Leandro Lezcano (ARG), Ahmed Al-Bulushi (OMA)

13 August 2016
17:45

Boxscore

Japan	79–71	France
Scoring by quarter: 17–19, 23–13, 23–22, 16–17
Pts: Yoshida 24; Rebs: Tokashiki 7 Asts: Yoshida 7		Pts: Epoupa, Yacoubou 14; Rebs: Gruda 9 Asts: Gruda 4

Youth Arena, Rio de Janeiro
Attendance: 3,351
Referees: Sreten Radović (CRO), Carlos Peruga (ESP), Carlos Júlio (ANG)

Quarterfinal

16 August 2016
18:45

Boxscore

United States	110–64	Japan
Scoring by quarter: 30–23, 26–23, 25–13, 29–5
Pts: Moore, Taurasi 19; Rebs: Griner 7 Asts: Charles 5		Pts: Tokashiki 14; Rebs: four players 3 Asts: Yoshida 8

Carioca Arena 1, Rio de Janeiro
Attendance: 7,471
Referees: Carlos Peruga (ESP), Duan Zhu (CHN), Carlos Júlio (ANG)

== Boxing ==
Japan has entered two boxers to compete in each of the following classes into the Olympic boxing tournament. Daisuke Narimatsu had claimed his Olympic spot with a box-off victory in the men's lightweight division at the 2016 Asia & Oceania Qualification Tournament in Qian'an, China, while bantamweight boxer Arashi Morisaka secured an additional place on the Japanese roster with his quarterfinal triumph at the 2016 AIBA World Qualifying Tournament in Baku, Azerbaijan.

Athlete	Event	Round of 32	Round of 16	Quarterfinals	Semifinals	Final	
Athlete	Event	Opposition Result	Opposition Result	Opposition Result	Opposition Result	Opposition Result	Rank
Arashi Morisaka	Men's bantamweight	Avagyan (ARM); L 1–2	Did not advance				
Daisuke Narimatsu	Men's lightweight	Cabrera (VEN); W 2–1	Balderas (USA); L 0–3	Did not advance			

== Canoeing ==
=== Slalom ===
Japanese canoeists have qualified a maximum of one boat in each of the following classes through the 2015 ICF Canoe Slalom World Championships and the 2016 Asian Championships.

Athlete	Event	Preliminary						Semifinal		Final	
Athlete	Event	Run 1	Rank	Run 2	Rank	Best	Rank	Time	Rank	Time	Rank
Takuya Haneda	Men's C-1	98.69	6	94.58	4	94.58	5 Q	98.84	6 Q	97.44	3rd place, bronze medalist(s)
Shota Sasaki; Tsubasa Sasaki	Men's C-2	122.04	10	119.04	10	119.04	12	Did not advance			
Kazuki Yazawa	Men's K-1	92.23	9	98.08	16	92.23	14 Q	97.19	11	Did not advance	
Aki Yazawa	Women's K-1	120.17	18	128.00	16	120.17	20	Did not advance			

== Cycling ==
=== Road ===
Japanese riders qualified for a maximum of two quota places in the men's Olympic road race by virtue of their top 4 national ranking in the 2015 UCI Asia Tour. One additional spot was awarded to the Japanese cyclist in the women's road race by virtue of her top 100 individual placement in the 2016 UCI World Rankings.

Athlete	Event	Time	Rank
Yukiya Arashiro	Men's road race	6:19:43	27
Kohei Uchima	Men's road race	Did not finish	
Eri Yonamine	Women's road race	3:56:23	17
Eri Yonamine	Women's time trial	46:43.09	15

=== Track ===
Following the completion of the 2016 UCI Track Cycling World Championships, Japanese riders have accumulated spots in the men's sprint and men's keirin, as well as both the men's and women's omnium, by virtue of their final individual UCI Olympic rankings in those events. The track cycling team was named to the Olympic roster on 6 April 2016.

Sprint

Athlete	Event	Qualification		Round 1	Repechage 1	Round 2	Repechage 2	Quarterfinals	Semifinals	Final	
Athlete	Event	Time Speed (km/h)	Rank	Opposition Time Speed (km/h)	Opposition Time Speed (km/h)	Opposition Time Speed (km/h)	Opposition Time Speed (km/h)	Opposition Time Speed (km/h)	Opposition Time Speed (km/h)	Opposition Time Speed (km/h)	Rank
Seiichiro Nakagawa	Men's sprint	10.241; 70.305	25	Did not advance							

Keirin

Athlete	Event	1st Round	Repechage	2nd Round	Final
Athlete	Event	Rank	Rank	Rank	Rank
Kazunari Watanabe	Men's keirin	5 R	4	Did not advance	
Yuta Wakimoto	Men's keirin	6 R	2	Did not advance	

Omnium

Athlete	Event	Scratch race		Individual pursuit			Elimination race		Time trial			Flying lap			Points race		Total points	Rank
Athlete	Event	Rank	Points	Time	Rank	Points	Rank	Points	Time	Rank	Points	Time	Rank	Points	Points	Rank	Total points	Rank
Kazushige Kuboki	Men's omnium	13	18	4:39.889	18	6	4	34	1:05.498	15	12	13.587	13	10	1	12	81	14
Sakura Tsukagoshi	Women's omnium	17	8	3:46.842	16	10	17	8	35.625	6	30	14.638	15	12	0	14	68	16

=== Mountain biking ===
Japan has qualified one mountain biker for the men's Olympic cross-country race, as a result of his nation's twenty-third-place finish in the UCI Olympic Ranking List of 25 May 2016. London 2012 Olympian Kohei Yamamoto was named to the Olympic roster on 9 June 2016.

Athlete	Event	Time	Rank
Kohei Yamamoto	Men's cross-country	1:40:34	21

=== BMX ===
Japanese riders qualified for one men's quota place in BMX at the Olympics, as a result of the nation's thirteenth-place finish in the UCI Olympic Ranking List of 31 May 2016, signifying the nation's return to the sport after an eight-year hiatus. Japan's top-ranked BMX rider Yoshitaku Nagasako was named to the Olympic roster on 9 June 2016.

Athlete	Event	Seeding		Quarterfinal		Semifinal		Final	
Athlete	Event	Result	Rank	Points	Rank	Points	Rank	Result	Rank
Yoshitaku Nagasako	Men's BMX	35.286	12	21	8	Did not advance			

== Diving ==
Japanese divers qualified for four individual spots at the Olympics through the 2015 FINA World Championships and the 2016 FINA World Cup series. Japanese Olympic Committee (JOC) announced the Olympic diving team on 11 April 2016.

Athlete	Event	Preliminaries		Semifinals		Final	
Athlete	Event	Points	Rank	Points	Rank	Points	Rank
Sho Sakai	Men's 3 m springboard	373.70	22	Did not advance			
Ken Terauchi	Men's 3 m springboard	380.85	20	Did not advance			
Minami Itahashi	Women's 10 m platform	320.20	10 Q	335.55	8 Q	356.60	8

== Equestrian ==
Japan has fielded a full squad of four equestrian riders each into the Olympic team jumping and dressage competition by obtaining a top finish each at the FEI qualification event for East Asia and Oceania in Hagen and Perl, Germany, respectively. Two eventing riders have been added to the squad by virtue of the following results in the individual FEI Olympic rankings: a top finish from Asia & Oceania, and a top two finish from the combined group of Africa, Middle East, Asia, and Oceania.

=== Dressage ===
Japanese Olympic selection trials were held on 1–2 June 2016 in Hagen, Germany, after which the final team was named.

Athlete	Horse	Event	Grand Prix		Grand Prix Special		Grand Prix Freestyle		Overall	
Athlete	Horse	Event	Score	Rank	Score	Rank	Technical	Artistic	Score	Rank
Kiichi Harada	Egistar	Individual	68.286	45	Did not advance					
Yuko Kitai	Don Lorean	Individual	67.271	48	Did not advance					
Akane Kuroki	Toots	Individual	66.900	50	Did not advance					
Masanao Takahashi	Fabriano	Individual	62.986	58	Did not advance					
Kiichi Harada; Yuko Kitai; Akane Kuroki; Masanao Takahashi	See above	Team	67.486	11	Did not advance		—N/a		67.486	11

=== Eventing ===
Athlete	Horse	Event	Dressage		Cross-country			Jumping						Total	
Athlete	Horse	Event	Dressage		Cross-country			Qualifier			Final			Total	
Athlete	Horse	Event	Penalties	Rank	Penalties	Total	Rank	Penalties	Total	Rank	Penalties	Total	Rank	Penalties	Rank
Ryuzo Kitajima	Just Chocolate	Individual	57.70	60	74.40	132.00	42	Withdrew			Did not advance				
Yoshiaki Oiwa	The Duke of Cavan	Individual	47.00	29	18.00	65.00	17	4.00	69.00	20 Q	8.00	77.00	20	77.00	20

=== Jumping ===
Athlete	Horse	Event	Qualification								Final					Total	
Athlete	Horse	Event	Round 1		Round 2			Round 3			Round A		Round B			Total	
Athlete	Horse	Event	Penalties	Rank	Penalties	Total	Rank	Penalties	Total	Rank	Penalties	Rank	Penalties	Total	Rank	Penalties	Rank
Daisuke Fukushima	Cornet	Individual	47 #	=68^{TO}	1	TO		Did not advance									
Toshiki Masui	Taloubetdarco	Individual	16	=64^{TO}	12	TO		Did not advance									
Taizo Sugitani	Imothep	Individual	16	=64^{TO}	12	TO		Did not advance									
Reiko Takeda	Bardolino	Individual	4	=27 Q	1	5	=26 Q	Retired			Did not advance						
Daisuke Fukushima; Toshiki Masui; Taizo Sugitani; Reiko Takeda	See above	Team	36	14	14	—N/a	13	Did not advance			—N/a					14	13

"TO" indicates that the rider only qualified for the team competition. "#" indicates that the score of this rider does not count in the team competition, since only the best three results of a team are counted.

== Fencing ==
Following the completion of the Grand Prix finals, Japan has entered four fencers into the Olympic competition. Kazuyasu Minobe, Chika Aoki, London 2012 Olympian Nozomi Sato (née Nakano), and Beijing 2008 silver medalist and 2015 World men's foil champion Yuki Ota had claimed their Olympic spots as one of the two highest-ranked fencers coming from the Asian zone in the FIE Adjusted Official Rankings. Kenta Tokunan and 2012 Olympian Shiho Nishioka rounded out the Japanese roster to six by virtue of a top three finish at the Asian Zonal Qualifier in Wuxi, China.

Athlete	Event	Round of 64	Round of 32	Round of 16	Quarterfinal	Semifinal	Final / BM	
Athlete	Event	Opposition Score	Opposition Score	Opposition Score	Opposition Score	Opposition Score	Opposition Score	Rank
Kazuyasu Minobe	Men's épée	Bye	Fichera (ITA); W 15–8	Avdeev (RUS); W 15–11	Grumier (FRA); L 8–15	Did not advance		
Yuki Ota	Men's foil	Bye	Toldo (BRA); L 13–15	Did not advance				
Kenta Tokunan	Men's sabre	—N/a	Anstett (FRA); L 13–15	Did not advance				
Nozomi Nakano	Women's épée	Terán (MEX); W 15–12	Logunova (RUS); W 15–14	Shemyakina (UKR); W 11–8	Szász (HUN); L 4–15	Did not advance		
Shiho Nishioka	Women's foil	Bye	Nam H-h (KOR); W 15–12	Boubakri (TUN); L 10–15	Did not advance			
Chika Aoki	Women's sabre	Grench (PAN); L 5–15	Did not advance					

== Field hockey ==
Summary

Key:

- FT – After full time.
- P – Match decided by penalty-shootout.

Team	Event	Group Stage						Quarterfinal	Semifinal	Final / BM	
Team	Event	Opposition Score	Opposition Score	Opposition Score	Opposition Score	Opposition Score	Rank	Opposition Score	Opposition Score	Opposition Score	Rank
Japan women's	Women's tournament	India; D 2–2	Argentina; L 0–4	United States; L 1–6	Great Britain; L 0–2	Australia; L 0–2	5	Did not advance			10

=== Women's tournament ===
Japan women's field hockey team qualified for the Olympics by having achieved the next highest placement in the 2014–2015 FIH Hockey World League Semifinals, among the countries that have not qualified yet for the Games.

Team roster

The following is the Japan roster in the women's field hockey tournament of the 2016 Summer Olympics.

Head coach: Yuji Nagai

1. Sakiyo Asano (GK)
2. Nagisa Hayashi
5. Miyuki Nakagawa (C)
6. Maki Sakaguchi
7. Aki Mitsuhashi
8. Ayaka Nishimura
9. Yuri Nagai
10. Mie Nakashima
11. Akane Shibata
13. Yukari Mano
14. Emi Nishikori
16. Mayumi Ono
22. Motomi Kawamura
30. Minami Shimizu
31. Hazuki Nagai
32. Hazuki Yuda

Reserves:

- Kano Nomura
- Yu Asai
- Ryoko Oie (GK)

Group play

Pos	Team	Pld	W	D	L	GF	GA	GD	Pts	Qualification
1	Great Britain	5	5	0	0	12	4	+8	15	Quarter-finals
2	United States	5	4	0	1	14	5	+9	12	Quarter-finals
3	Australia	5	3	0	2	11	5	+6	9	Quarter-finals
4	Argentina	5	2	0	3	12	6	+6	6	Quarter-finals
5	Japan	5	0	1	4	3	16	−13	1	
6	India	5	0	1	4	3	19	−16	1	

Source: Rio2016
Rules for classification: 1) Points; 2) Matches won; 3) Goal difference; 4) Goals for; 5) Head-to-head result.

7 August 2016
11:00

Japan	2–2	India
Nishikori 15'; Nakashima 28'	Report	Rani 31'; Minz 40'

Umpires:
Kylie Seymour (AUS)
Kelly Hudson (NZL)

8 August 2016
20:30

Argentina	4–0	Japan
Barrionuevo 13', 18'; Rebecchi 48'; Granatto 50'	Report

Umpires:
Melissa Trivic (AUS)
Laurine Delforge (BEL)

10 August 2016
17:00

United States	6–1	Japan
González 1'; Bam 5', 52', 60'; Reinprecht 29'; Witmer 37'	Report	Nakashima 47'

Umpires:
Amber Church (NZL)
Fanneke Alkemade (NED)

11 August 2016
20:30

Japan	0–2	Great Britain
	Report	Owsley 5'; White 55'

Umpires:
Kylie Seymour (AUS)
Elena Eskina (RUS)

13 August 2016
19:30

Australia	2–0	Japan
Williams 17'; Smith 55'	Report

Umpires:
Elena Eskina (RUS)
Kelly Hudson (NZL)

== Football ==
Summary

Key:

- A.E.T – After extra time.
- P – Match decided by penalty-shootout.

Team	Event	Group Stage				Quarterfinal	Semifinal	Final / BM	
Team	Event	Opposition Score	Opposition Score	Opposition Score	Rank	Opposition Score	Opposition Score	Opposition Score	Rank
Japan men's	Men's tournament	Nigeria; L 4–5	Colombia; D 2–2	Sweden; W 1–0	3	Did not advance			10

=== Men's tournament ===
Japan men's football team qualified for the Olympics by virtue of a top two finish at and by progressing to the gold medal match of the 2016 AFC U-23 Championship in Qatar.

Team roster

The following is the Japan squad in the men's football tournament of the 2016 Summer Olympics. The team of 18 players was officially named on 1 July.

Head coach: Makoto Teguramori

No.	Pos.	Player	Date of birth (age)	Caps	Goals	Club
1	GK	Masatoshi Kushibiki	29 January 1993 (aged 23)	0	0	(Japan Football Association) Kashima Antlers
2	DF	Sei Muroya	5 April 1994 (aged 22)	0	0	(Japan Football Association) FC Tokyo
3	MF	Wataru Endo (c)	9 February 1993 (aged 23)	0	0	(Japan Football Association) Urawa Red Diamonds
4	DF	Hiroki Fujiharu*	28 November 1988 (aged 27)	0	0	(Japan Football Association) Gamba Osaka
5	DF	Naomichi Ueda	24 October 1994 (aged 21)	0	0	(Japan Football Association) Kashima Antlers
6	DF	Tsukasa Shiotani*	5 December 1988 (aged 27)	0	0	(Japan Football Association) Sanfrecce Hiroshima
7	MF	Riki Harakawa	13 August 1993 (aged 22)	0	0	(Japan Football Association) Kawasaki Frontale
8	MF	Ryota Oshima	23 January 1993 (aged 23)	0	0	(Japan Football Association) Kawasaki Frontale
9	MF	Shinya Yajima	18 January 1994 (aged 22)	0	0	(Japan Football Association) Fagiano Okayama
10	MF	Shoya Nakajima	23 August 1994 (aged 21)	0	0	(Japan Football Association) FC Tokyo
11	FW	Musashi Suzuki	11 February 1994 (aged 22)	0	0	(Japan Football Association) Albirex Niigata
12	GK	Kosuke Nakamura	27 February 1995 (aged 21)	0	0	(Japan Football Association) Kashiwa Reysol
13	FW	Shinzo Koroki*	31 July 1986 (aged 30)	0	0	(Japan Football Association) Urawa Red Diamonds
14	MF	Yosuke Ideguchi	23 August 1996 (aged 19)	0	0	(Japan Football Association) Gamba Osaka
15	DF	Masashi Kamekawa	28 May 1993 (aged 23)	0	0	(Japan Football Association) Avispa Fukuoka
16	FW	Takuma Asano	10 November 1994 (aged 21)	0	0	(The Football Association) Arsenal
17	DF	Takuya Iwanami	18 June 1994 (aged 22)	0	0	(Japan Football Association) Vissel Kobe
18	MF	Takumi Minamino	16 January 1995 (aged 21)	0	0	(Austrian Football Association) Red Bull Salzburg

* Over-aged player.

Group play

Pos	Team	Pld	W	D	L	GF	GA	GD	Pts	Qualification
1	Nigeria	3	2	0	1	6	6	0	6	Quarter-finals
2	Colombia	3	1	2	0	6	4	+2	5	Quarter-finals
3	Japan	3	1	1	1	7	7	0	4	
4	Sweden	3	0	1	2	2	4	−2	1	

Source: Rio2016 & FIFA
Rules for classification: Tiebreakers
4 August 2016
22:00 (21:00 UTC–4)

Nigeria	5–4	Japan
Sadiq 6'; Etebo 10', 42', 52' (pen.), 66'	Report (Rio2016); Report (FIFA)	Koroki 9' (pen.); Minamino 12'; Asano 70'; Suzuki 90+5'

Arena da Amazônia, Manaus
Attendance: 29,996
Referee: Clément Turpin (France)

7 August 2016
22:00 (21:00 UTC–4)

Japan	2–2	Colombia
Asano 67'; Nakajima 74'	Report (Rio2016); Report (FIFA)	Gutiérrez 59'; Fujiharu 65' (o.g.)

Arena da Amazônia, Manaus
Attendance: 26,603
Referee: Sergei Karasev (Russia)

10 August 2016
19:00

Japan	1–0	Sweden
Yajima 65'	Report (Rio2016); Report (FIFA)

Itaipava Arena Fonte Nova, Salvador
Attendance: 17,821
Referee: Malang Diedhiou (Senegal)

== Golf ==
Japan has entered four golfers (two per gender) into the Olympic tournament. Yuta Ikeda (world no. 93), Shingo Katayama (world no. 107), Haru Nomura (world no. 22) and Shiho Oyama (world no. 43) qualified directly among the top 60 eligible players for their respective individual events based on the IGF World Rankings as of 11 July 2016.

Athlete	Event	Round 1	Round 2	Round 3	Round 4	Total		
Athlete	Event	Score	Score	Score	Score	Score	Par	Rank
Yuta Ikeda	Men's	74	69	69	69	281	−3	=21
Shingo Katayama	Men's	74	75	76	66	292	+8	54
Haru Nomura	Women's	69	69	72	65	275	−9	=4
Shiho Oyama	Women's	70	71	77	74	292	+8	42

== Gymnastics ==
=== Artistic ===
Japan fielded a full squad of five gymnasts in both the men's and women's artistic gymnastics events through a top eight finish each in the team all-around at the 2015 World Artistic Gymnastics Championships in Glasgow. The men's and women's gymnastics squads, led by London 2012 individual all-around champion Kōhei Uchimura, were named to the Olympic roster at the conclusion of the All-Japan Championships (for men) and NHK Trophy (for women) in Tokyo on 5 June 2016.

Men
Team

Athlete	Event	Qualification								Final							
Athlete	Event	Apparatus						Total	Rank	Apparatus						Total	Rank
Athlete	Event	F	PH	R	V	PB	HB	Total	Rank	F	PH	R	V	PB	HB	Total	Rank
Ryōhei Katō	Team	15.033	14.800	13.996	14.933	15.500 Q	15.000	89.232	6 Q	15.466	14.933	—N/a	15.000	15.500	15.066	—N/a	
Kenzō Shirai	Team	15.333 Q	—N/a		15.466 Q	—N/a				16.133	—N/a		15.633	—N/a		—N/a	
Yūsuke Tanaka	Team	15.233	13.366	14.733	—N/a	14.666	—N/a			—N/a		14.933	—N/a	15.900	15.166	—N/a	
Kōhei Uchimura	Team	15.533 Q	14.966	14.700	15.533	15.466	14.300	90.498	2 Q	15.600	15.100	14.800	15.566	15.366	15.166	—N/a	
Koji Yamamuro	Team	—N/a	14.533	14.700	13.200	12.733	14.333	—N/a		—N/a	13.900	14.866	—N/a			—N/a	
Total	Team	46.099	44.299	44.133	45.932	44.832	43.999	269.294	4 Q	47.199	43.933	44.599	46.199	46.766	45.398	274.094	1st place, gold medalist(s)

Individual finals

Athlete	Event	Apparatus						Total	Rank
Athlete	Event	F	PH	R	V	PB	HB	Total	Rank
Ryōhei Katō	All-around	15.266	14.900	14.566	15.058	14.900	13.900	88.590	11
Ryōhei Katō	Parallel bars	—N/a				15.233	—N/a	15.233	7
Kenzō Shirai	Floor	15.366	—N/a					15.366	4
Kenzō Shirai	Vault	—N/a			15.449	—N/a		15.449	3rd place, bronze medalist(s)
Kōhei Uchimura	All-around	15.766	14.900	14.733	15.566	15.600	15.800	92.365	1st place, gold medalist(s)
Kōhei Uchimura	Floor	15.241	—N/a					15.241	5

Women
Team

Athlete	Event	Qualification						Final					
Athlete	Event	Apparatus				Total	Rank	Apparatus				Total	Rank
Athlete	Event	V	UB	BB	F	Total	Rank	V	UB	BB	F	Total	Rank
Sae Miyakawa	Team	14.966	—N/a		13.266	—N/a		15.066	—N/a		13.908	—N/a	
Mai Murakami	Team	14.700	14.166	13.833	14.566 Q	57.265	9 Q	14.833	—N/a	13.833	14.466	—N/a	
Aiko Sugihara	Team	14.300	14.400	14.133	14.033	56.866	16	—N/a	14.600	14.300	14.100	—N/a	
Asuka Teramoto	Team	14.800	14.900	13.666	13.700	57.066	12 Q	14.933	14.866	14.466	—N/a	—N/a	
Yuki Uchiyama	Team	—N/a	14.800	13.733	—N/a			—N/a	15.000	—N/a		—N/a	
Total	Team	44.466	44.100	41.699	42.299	172.564	7 Q	44.832	44.466	42.599	42.474	174.371	4

Individual finals

Athlete	Event	Apparatus				Total	Rank
Athlete	Event	V	UB	BB	F	Total	Rank
Mai Murakami	All-around	14.866	13.766	13.900	14.133	56.665	14
Mai Murakami	Floor	—N/a			14.533	14.533	7
Asuka Teramoto	All-around	15.100	14.566	14.266	14.033	57.965	8

=== Rhythmic ===
Japan has qualified a squad of rhythmic gymnasts for the individual and group all-around by finishing in the top 15 (for individual) and top 10 (for group) at the 2015 World Championships in Stuttgart, Germany.

Athlete	Event	Qualification						Final					
Athlete	Event	Hoop	Ball	Clubs	Ribbon	Total	Rank	Hoop	Ball	Clubs	Ribbon	Total	Rank
Kaho Minagawa	Individual	16.666	17.341	17.500	17.016	68.52	16	Did not advance					

Athlete	Event	Qualification				Final			
Athlete	Event	5 balls	3 clubs 2 hoops	Total	Rank	5 balls	3 clubs 2 hoops	Total	Rank
Airi Hatakeyama; Rie Matsubara; Sakura Noshitani; Sayuri Sugimoto; Kiko Yokota	Team	17.416	17.733	35.149	5 Q	16.550	17.650	34.200	8

=== Trampoline ===
Japan has qualified two gymnasts in the men's trampoline by virtue of a top eight finish at the 2015 World Championships in Odense, Denmark. Meanwhile, an additional Olympic berth had been awarded to the Japanese female gymnast, who finished in the top six at the 2016 Olympic Test Event in Rio de Janeiro.

Athlete	Event	Qualification		Final	
Athlete	Event	Score	Rank	Score	Rank
Masaki Ito	Men's	108.465	6 Q	58.800	6
Ginga Munetomo	Men's	108.190	7 Q	59.535	4
Rana Nakano	Women's	96.775	13	Did not advance	

== Judo ==
Japan has qualified a full squad of 14 judokas (seven men and seven women) for each of the following weight classes at the Games by virtue of their top 22 national finish for men and top 14 for women in the IJF World Ranking List of 30 May 2016. Twelve members of the judo team, highlighted by London 2012 champion Kaori Matsumoto and bronze medalist Masashi Ebinuma, were named to the Olympic roster at the All-Japan Championships on 3 April 2016, while the heavyweight judokas rounded out the selection at the end of IJF World Masters in Guadalajara, Mexico.

Men

Athlete	Event	Round of 64	Round of 32	Round of 16	Quarterfinals	Semifinals	Repechage	Final / BM	
Athlete	Event	Opposition Result	Opposition Result	Opposition Result	Opposition Result	Opposition Result	Opposition Result	Opposition Result	Rank
Naohisa Takato	−60 kg	Bye	Siccardi (MON); W 101–000	Petřikov (CZE); W 100–000	Papinashvili (GEO); L 000–100	Did not advance	Kim W-j (KOR); W 001–000	Safarov (AZE); W 000–000 S	3rd place, bronze medalist(s)
Masashi Ebinuma	−66 kg	Bye	Chibana (BRA); W 101–000	Ma Db (CHN); W 111–000	Mateo (DOM); W 111–000	An B-u (KOR); L 000–001	Bye	Bouchard (CAN); W 101–000	3rd place, bronze medalist(s)
Shohei Ono	−73 kg	Bye	Murillo (CRC); W 100–000	Scvortov (UAE); W 100–000	Shavdatuashvili (GEO); W 010–000	van Tichelt (BEL); W 111–000	Bye	Orujov (AZE); W 110–000	1st place, gold medalist(s)
Takanori Nagase	−81 kg	Bye	Csoknyai (HUN); W 001–000	Kibikal (GAB); W 100–000	Toma (MDA); L 000–001	Did not advance	Valois-Fortier (CAN); W 100–000	Tchrikishvili (GEO); W 001–000	3rd place, bronze medalist(s)
Mashu Baker	−90 kg	Bye	Odenthal (GER); W 100–000	Kukolj (SRB); W 100–000	Iddir (FRA); W 100–000	Cheng Xz (CHN); W 100–000	Bye	Liparteliani (GEO); W 001–000	1st place, gold medalist(s)
Ryunosuke Haga	−100 kg	Bye	Borodavko (LAT); W 001–000	Buzacarini (BRA); W 000–000 S	Krpálek (CZE); L 000–000 S	Did not advance	Gviniashvili (GEO); W 000–000 S	Bloshenko (UKR); W 100–000	3rd place, bronze medalist(s)
Hisayoshi Harasawa	+100 kg	—N/a	Okruashvili (GEO); W 000–000 S	Kokauri (AZE); W 100–000	García (CUB); W 100–000	Tangriev (UZB); W 101–000	Bye	Riner (FRA); L 000–000 S	2nd place, silver medalist(s)

Women

Athlete	Event	Round of 32	Round of 16	Quarterfinals	Semifinals	Repechage	Final / BM	
Athlete	Event	Opposition Result	Opposition Result	Opposition Result	Opposition Result	Opposition Result	Opposition Result	Rank
Ami Kondo	−48 kg	Bye	Carrillo (MEX); W 101–000	Galbadrakh (KAZ); W 100–010	Pareto (ARG); L 000–010	Bye	Mönkhbat (MGL); W 001–000	3rd place, bronze medalist(s)
Misato Nakamura	−52 kg	Bye	Tsolmon (MGL); W 100–000	Kuziutina (RUS); W 100–000	Kelmendi (KOS); L 000–000 S	Bye	Miranda (BRA); W 001–000	3rd place, bronze medalist(s)
Kaori Matsumoto	−57 kg	Bye	Dabonne (CIV); W 101–000	Pavia (FRA); W 010–000	Dorjsüren (MGL); L 000–100	Bye	Lien C-l (TPE); W 100–000	3rd place, bronze medalist(s)
Miku Tashiro	−63 kg	Bye	Haecker (AUS); W 111–000	Unterwurzacher (AUT); W 001–000	Agbegnenou (FRA); L 000–000	Bye	Gerbi (ISR); L 000–011	5
Haruka Tachimoto	−70 kg	Zhou C (CHN); W 100–000	Polling (NED); W 002–001	Zupancic (CAN); W 010–000	Koch (GER); W 010–000	Bye	Alvear (COL); W 100–000	1st place, gold medalist(s)
Mami Umeki	−78 kg	Bye	Joó (HUN); L 000–002	Did not advance				
Kanae Yamabe	+78 kg	Bye	Pakenytė (LTU); W 100–000	Savelkouls (NED); W 101–000	Ortiz (CUB); L 000–001	Bye	Sayit (TUR); W 010–000	3rd place, bronze medalist(s)

== Modern pentathlon ==
Japan has qualified a total of three modern pentathletes for the following events at the Games. Natsumi Tomonaga finished among the top five in the women's modern pentathlon, while Tomoya Miguchi and Shōhei Iwamoto received spare Olympic berths freed up by China and South Korea, as the highest-ranked eligible individuals, not yet qualified, in the men's event at the 2015 Asia & Oceania Championships.

Athlete	Event	Fencing (épée one touch)				Swimming (200 m freestyle)			Riding (show jumping)			Combined: shooting/running (10 m air pistol)/(3200 m)			Total points	Final rank
Athlete	Event	RR	BR	Rank	MP points	Time	Rank	MP points	Penalties	Rank	MP points	Time	Rank	MP Points	Total points	Final rank
Shōhei Iwamoto	Men's	9–26	0	36	154	2:08.65	33	315	0	1	300	11:54.59	30	586	1355	30
Tomoya Miguchi	Men's	20–15	0	11	220	2:02.62	12	333	19	20	281	12:02.88	31	578	1412	22
Natsumi Tomonaga	Women's	15–20	0	27	190	2:15.63	12	294	2	6	298	12:55.44	15	525	1307	13

== Rowing ==
Japan has qualified one boat each in the men's and women's lightweight double sculls, respectively, for the Olympics at the 2016 Asia & Oceania Continental Qualification Regatta in Chungju, South Korea.

Athlete	Event	Heats		Repechage		Semifinals		Final	
Athlete	Event	Time	Rank	Time	Rank	Time	Rank	Time	Rank
Hiroshi Nakano; Hideki Omoto	Men's lightweight double sculls	6:34.27	3 R	7:11.20	3 SC/D	7:30.64	3 FC	6:45.81	15
Ayami Oishi; Chiaki Tomita	Women's lightweight double sculls	7:15.75	4 R	8:00.50	2 SA/B	7:46.41	6 FB	7:42.87	12

Qualification Legend: FA=Final A (medal); FB=Final B (non-medal); FC=Final C (non-medal); FD=Final D (non-medal); FE=Final E (non-medal); FF=Final F (non-medal); SA/B=Semifinals A/B; SC/D=Semifinals C/D; SE/F=Semifinals E/F; QF=Quarterfinals; R=Repechage

== Rugby sevens ==
=== Men's tournament ===
Japan men's rugby sevens team qualified for the Olympics by winning the 2015 ARFU Men's Sevens Championships in Hong Kong.

Team roster

The following is the Japan roster in the men's rugby sevens tournament of the 2016 Summer Olympics.

Head coach: Tomohiro Segawa

No.	Pos.	Player	Date of birth (age)	Events	Points	Union
1	BK	Lomano Lemeki	20 January 1989 (aged 27)	14	221	(Japan) Honda Heat
2	FW	Lote Tuqiri	12 November 1987 (aged 28)	20	125	(Japan) Kubota Spears
3	FW	Yoshitaka Tokunaga	10 April 1992 (aged 24)	3	5	(Japan) Toshiba Brave Lupus
4	FW	Yusaku Kuwazuru (c)	23 October 1985 (aged 30)	31	45	(Japan) Coca-Cola Red Sparks
5	FW	Kameli Soejima	1 June 1983 (aged 33)	8	92	(Japan) Genkai Tangaroa
6	FW	Masakatsu Hikosaka	18 January 1991 (aged 25)	12	35	(Japan) Toyota Verblitz
7	BK	Katsuyuki Sakai	7 September 1988 (aged 27)	23	424	(Japan) Toyota Industries Shuttles
8	BK	Kazushi Hano	21 June 1991 (aged 25)	13	45	(Japan) NTT Communications Shining Arcs
9	BK	Shohei Toyoshima	9 January 1989 (aged 27)	11	105	(Japan) Toshiba Brave Lupus
10	BK	Teruya Goto	18 December 1991 (aged 24)	4	15	(Japan) NEC Green Rockets
11	BK	Kenki Fukuoka	7 September 1992 (aged 23)	2	10	(Japan) Panasonic Wild Knights
12	BK	Kazuhiro Goya	21 April 1993 (aged 23)	12	53	(Japan) Kubota Spears

Group play

Pos	Team	Pld	W	D	L	PF	PA	PD	Pts	Qualification
1	Great Britain	3	3	0	0	73	45	+28	9	Quarter-finals
2	Japan	3	2	0	1	64	40	+24	7	Quarter-finals
3	New Zealand	3	1	0	2	59	40	+19	5	Quarter-finals
4	Kenya	3	0	0	3	19	90	−71	3	

Source: World Rugby
Rules for classification: 1) Points; 2) Head-to-head result; 3) Point difference; 4) Points scored.

9 August 2016
12:30

New Zealand	12–14	Japan
Try: Curry 6' c A. Ioane 10' m Con: Kaka (1/2)	Report (Rio 2016); Report (World Rugby)	Try: Goto 3' c Soejima 12' c Con: Lemeki (1/1); Sakai (1/1)

Deodoro Stadium, Rio de Janeiro
Referee: Marius van der Westhuizen (South Africa)

9 August 2016
17:00

Great Britain	21–19	Japan
Try: Rodwell (2) 1' c, 2' c Watson 13' c Con: Mitchell (3/3)	Report (Rio 2016); Report (World Rugby)	Try: Lemeki (2) 6' c, 14' m Sakai 11' c Con: Goya (1/1); Sakai (1/2)

Deodoro Stadium, Rio de Janeiro
Referee: Nick Briant (New Zealand)

10 August 2016
12:00

Kenya	7–31	Japan
Try: Injera 4' c Con: Oliech (1/1)	Report (Rio 2016); Report (World Rugby)	Try: Hano 1' c Lemeki (2) 7' c, 13' m Goya 9' m Penalty try 11' c Con: Goya (3/5)

Deodoro Stadium, Rio de Janeiro
Referee: Matthew O'Brien (Australia)

Quarterfinal

10 August 2016
17:30

Japan	12–7	France
Try: Tuqiri 8' m Goto 7' c Con: Sakai (1/2)	Report (Rio 2016); Report (World Rugby)	Try: Cler 4' c Con: Bouhraoua (1/1)

Deodoro Stadium, Rio de Janeiro
Referee: Richard Kelly (New Zealand)

Semifinal

11 August 2016
14:30

Fiji	20–5	Japan
Try: Ravouvou 1' m Tuisova 6' m Kunatani 9' m Tuwai 10' m Con: Ravouvou (0/3); Kolinisau (0/1)	Report (Rio 2016); Report (World Rugby)	Try: Goto 4' m Con: Lemeki (0/1)

Deodoro Stadium, Rio de Janeiro
Referee: Mike Adamson (Great Britain)

Bronze medal match

11 August 2016
18:30

Japan	14–54	South Africa (bronze)
Try: Kuwazuru 8' c Goya 11' c Con: Goya (2/2)	Report (Rio 2016); Report (World Rugby)	Try: De Jongh 1' c Speckman (3) 3' c, 10' c, 19' c Afrika (2) 12' c, 15' c Geduld 17' m Kolbe 20' c Con: Afrika (5/6); Geduld (2/2)

Deodoro Stadium, Rio de Janeiro
Referee: Alexandre Ruiz (France)

=== Women's tournament ===
Japan women's rugby sevens team qualified for the Olympics by winning the 2015 ARFU Women's Sevens Championships in Hong Kong and Japan.

Team roster

The following is the Japan roster in the women's rugby sevens tournament of the 2016 Summer Olympics.

Head coach: Keiko Asami

Backs		Forwards
1	Chiharu Nakamura (c)	3	Noriko Taniguchi
7	Marie Yamaguchi	4	Mio Yamanaka
9	Mifuyu Koide	5	Ayaka Suzuki
10	Yume Okuroda	6	Ano Kuwai
11	Yuka Kanematsu	8	Chisato Yokoo
2	Makiko Tomita	12	Kana Mitsugi
		13	Aya Takeuchi

- Reserve Aya Takeuchi was added to the main squad after day 1 after Tomita suffered an injury.

Group play

Pos	Team	Pld	W	D	L	PF	PA	PD	Pts	Qualification
1	Great Britain	3	3	0	0	91	3	+88	9	Quarter-finals
2	Canada	3	2	0	1	83	22	+61	7	Quarter-finals
3	Brazil (H)	3	1	0	2	29	77	−48	5	
4	Japan	3	0	0	3	10	111	−101	3	

Source: World Rugby
Rules for classification: 1) Points; 2) Head-to-head result; 3) Point difference; 4) Points scored.
(H) Hosts

6 August 2016
12:30

Canada	45–0	Japan
Try: Landry (2) 1' c, 6' c Moleschi 3' c Farella (2) 4' m, 9' m Benn 13' c Watcham-Roy 14' c Con: Landry (3/4); Russell (2/3)	Report (Rio 2016); Report (World Rugby)

Deodoro Stadium, Rio de Janeiro
Referee: James Bolabiu (Fiji)

6 August 2016
17:00

Great Britain	40–0	Japan
Try: Wilson-Hardy 1' c Richardson 4' c Watmore 6' c McLean 7' m Scott 10' c Fisher 16' c Con: Richardson (3/3); McLean (0/1); Scott (2/2)	Report (Rio 2016); Report (World Rugby)

Deodoro Stadium, Rio de Janeiro
Referee: Rasta Rasivhenge (South Africa)

7 August 2016
12:00

Brazil	26–10	Japan
Try: Ishibashi 2' m Muhlbauer (2) 10' c, 14' c Araújo 12' c Con: Kochhann (2/3); Balconi (1/1)	Report (Rio 2016); Report (World Rugby)	Try: Kuwai 7' m Yamaguchi 8' m Con: Okuroda (0/2)

Deodoro Stadium, Rio de Janeiro
Referee: Gabriel Lee (Hong Kong)

Classification semifinal (9–12)

7 August 2016
16:30

Kenya	0–24	Japan
	Report (Rio 2016); Report (World Rugby)	Try: Yamaguchi (2) 2' m, 6' c Kuwai 8' m Kanematsu 13' c Con: Okuroda (1/2); Yamanaka (1/2)

Deodoro Stadium, Rio de Janeiro
Referee: Aimee Barrett (South Africa)

Ninth place match

8 August 2016
13:00

Brazil	33–5	Japan
Try: Muhlbauer 5' c Campos 7' m Ishibashi 8' c Scatrut 9' c Cerullo 13' c Con: Kochhann (4/5)	Report (Rio 2016); Report (World Rugby)	Try: Okuroda 3' m Con: Okuroda (0/1)

Deodoro Stadium, Rio de Janeiro
Referee: Alhambra Nievas (Spain)

== Sailing ==
Japanese sailors have qualified one boat in each of the following classes through the 2014 ISAF Sailing World Championships, the individual fleet Worlds, and Asian qualifying regattas.

A total of eleven Japanese sailors were officially named to the Olympic team on 1 July 2016, with windsurfer Makoto Tomizawa and skiff yachtsman Yukio Makino racing through the Rio regatta at their third straight Games.

Men

Athlete	Event	Race													Net points	Final rank
Athlete	Event	1	2	3	4	5	6	7	8	9	10	11	12	M*	Net points	Final rank
Makoto Tomizawa	RS:X	10	8	18	19	13	~~22~~	7	14	18	15	14	2	EL	138	15
Kazuto Doi; Kimihiko Imamura	470	15	21	16	16	15	16	~~22~~	12	7	17	—N/a		EL	135	17
Yukio Makino; Kenji Takahashi	49er	3	15	17	8	8	2	~~20~~	12	17	15	16	20	EL	132	18

Women

Athlete	Event	Race													Net points	Final rank
Athlete	Event	1	2	3	4	5	6	7	8	9	10	11	12	M*	Net points	Final rank
Megumi Iseda	RS:X	23	22	19	22	15	14	~~27~~	13	19	13	18	20	EL	198	20
Manami Doi	Laser Radial	21	14	18	~~24~~	24	23	2	1	15	21	—N/a		EL	139	20
Ai Kondo; Miho Yoshioka	470	1	4	3	7	~~19~~	9	12	4	11	1	—N/a		14	66	5
Keiko Miyagawa; Sena Takano	49erFX	~~UFD~~	15	20	19	18	20	20	19	UFD	19	19	20	EL	210	20

M = Medal race; EL = Eliminated – did not advance into the medal race

== Shooting ==
Japanese shooters have achieved quota places for the following events by virtue of their best finishes at the 2015 ISSF World Cup series, World Shotgun Championships, and Asian Championships, as long as they obtained a minimum qualifying score (MQS) by 31 March 2016.

In December 2015, the Japanese Olympic Committee had officially announced the names of three shooters to compete at the Games. The remaining Japanese shooters (Akiyama, Ishihara, Mori, Okada, and Sato) had claimed their Olympic spots at the Asian Qualification Tournament in New Delhi, India to round out the team selection.

Men

Athlete	Event	Qualification		Final	
Athlete	Event	Points	Rank	Points	Rank
Teruyoshi Akiyama	25 m rapid fire pistol	564	22	Did not advance	
Tomoyuki Matsuda	10 m air pistol	576	22	Did not advance	
Tomoyuki Matsuda	50 m pistol	550	19	Did not advance	
Eita Mori	25 m rapid fire pistol	570	19	Did not advance	
Naoya Okada	10 m air rifle	622.6	20	Did not advance	
Toshikazu Yamashita	10 m air rifle	619.5	36	Did not advance	
Toshikazu Yamashita	50 m rifle prone	617.4	41	Did not advance	
Toshikazu Yamashita	50 m rifle 3 positions	1169	22	Did not advance	

Women

Athlete	Event	Qualification		Semifinal		Final	
Athlete	Event	Points	Rank	Points	Rank	Points	Rank
Naoko Ishihara	Skeet	62	18	Did not advance			
Yukie Nakayama	Trap	61	20	Did not advance			
Akiko Sato	10 m air pistol	369	42	—N/a		Did not advance	
Akiko Sato	25 m pistol	565	34	Did not advance			

Qualification Legend: Q = Qualify for the next round; q = Qualify for the bronze medal (shotgun)

== Swimming ==
Japanese swimmers have so far achieved qualifying standards in the following events (up to a maximum of 2 swimmers in each event at the Olympic Qualifying Time (OQT), and potentially 1 at the Olympic Selection Time (OST)): They must finish in the top two of each individual pool event under both the federation's required standard and an Olympic Qualifying Time at the 2016 Japan Open Swim Trials (4 to 10 April in Tokyo) to assure their selection to the Olympic team.

A total of 34 swimmers (17 per gender) had been selected to the Japanese roster for the Olympics, the second largest in history. Among them were London 2012 medalists Kosuke Hagino and Ryosuke Irie, 2015 World champions Daiya Seto, Natsumi Hoshi and Kanako Watanabe, Olympic veterans Takeshi Matsuda and Takuro Fujii, and rising teen Rikako Ikee.

Men

Athlete	Event	Heat		Semifinal		Final	
Athlete	Event	Time	Rank	Time	Rank	Time	Rank
Naito Ehara	400 m freestyle	3:50.61	31	—N/a		Did not advance	
Takuro Fujii	100 m butterfly	52.36	20	Did not advance			
Hiromasa Fujimori	200 m individual medley	1:58.88	7 Q	1:58.20	7 Q	1:57.21	4
Kosuke Hagino	200 m freestyle	1:46.19	7 Q	1:45.45	2 Q	1:45.90	7
Kosuke Hagino	200 m individual medley	1:58.79	6 Q	1:57.38	4 Q	1:56.61	2nd place, silver medalist(s)
Kosuke Hagino	400 m individual medley	4:10.00	3 Q	—N/a		4:06.05	1st place, gold medalist(s)
Junya Hasegawa	100 m backstroke	54.17	19	Did not advance			
Yasunari Hirai	10 km open water	—N/a				1:53:04.6	8
Ryosuke Irie	100 m backstroke	53.49	8 Q	53.21	7 Q	53.42	7
Ryosuke Irie	200 m backstroke	1:56.61	8 Q	1:56.31	7 Q	1:56.36	8
Masaki Kaneko	200 m backstroke	1:57.19	13 Q	1:56.78	11	Did not advance	
Yasuhiro Koseki	100 m breaststroke	58.91	2 Q	59.23	4 Q	59.37	6
Yasuhiro Koseki	200 m breaststroke	2:08.61	2 Q	2:07.91	4 Q	2:07.80	5
Katsumi Nakamura	50 m freestyle	22.13	18	Did not advance			
Katsumi Nakamura	100 m freestyle	48.61	17	Did not advance			
Masato Sakai	200 m butterfly	1:55.76	6 Q	1:55.32	6 Q	1:53.40	2nd place, silver medalist(s)
Daiya Seto	200 m butterfly	1:55.79	8 Q	1:55.28	5 Q	1:54.82	5
Daiya Seto	400 m individual medley	4:08.47	2 Q	—N/a		4:09.71	3rd place, bronze medalist(s)
Shinri Shioura	50 m freestyle	22.01	=14 Q	22.18	16	Did not advance	
Shinri Shioura	100 m freestyle	48.94	27	Did not advance			
Ippei Watanabe	100 m breaststroke	1:00.33	18	Did not advance			
Ippei Watanabe	200 m breaststroke	2:09.63	8 Q	2:07.22 OR	1 Q	2:07.87	6
Kenji Kobase; Junya Koga; Katsumi Nakamura; Shinri Shioura	4 × 100 m freestyle relay	3:14.17 NR	8 Q	—N/a		3:14.48	8
Naito Ehara; Kosuke Hagino; Yuki Kobori; Takeshi Matsuda	4 × 200 m freestyle relay	7:07.68	5 Q	—N/a		7:03.50	3rd place, bronze medalist(s)
Takuro Fujii; Ryosuke Irie; Yasuhiro Koseki; Katsumi Nakamura*; Shinri Shioura	4 × 100 m medley relay	3:32.33	3 Q	—N/a		3:31.97	5

Women

Athlete	Event	Heat		Semifinal		Final	
Athlete	Event	Time	Rank	Time	Rank	Time	Rank
Suzuka Hasegawa	200 m butterfly	2:07.35	6 Q	2:07.33	9	Did not advance	
Natsumi Hoshi	100 m butterfly	58.15	14 Q	58.03	10	Did not advance	
Natsumi Hoshi	200 m butterfly	2:07.37	7 Q	2:06.74	4 Q	2:05.20	3rd place, bronze medalist(s)
Chihiro Igarashi	200 m freestyle	1:57.88	17	Did not advance			
Chihiro Igarashi	400 m freestyle	4:07.52	12	—N/a		Did not advance	
Rikako Ikee	50 m freestyle	25.45	36	Did not advance			
Rikako Ikee	100 m freestyle	54.50	=16 Q	54.31	12	Did not advance	
Rikako Ikee	200 m freestyle	1:58.49	21	Did not advance			
Rikako Ikee	100 m butterfly	57.27	7 Q	57.05	3 Q	56.86	5
Runa Imai	200 m individual medley	2:11.78	11 Q	2:12.53	15	Did not advance	
Rie Kaneto	200 m breaststroke	2:22.86	2 Q	2:22.11	2 Q	2:20.30	1st place, gold medalist(s)
Yumi Kida	10 km open water	—N/a				1:57:35.2	12
Yayoi Matsumoto	50 m freestyle	25.73	43	Did not advance			
Natsumi Sakai	100 m backstroke	1:01.74	26	Did not advance			
Natsumi Sakai	200 m backstroke	2:13.99	26	Did not advance			
Sakiko Shimizu	400 m individual medley	4:34.66	7 Q	—N/a		4:38.06	8
Satomi Suzuki	100 m breaststroke	1:06.99	13 Q	1:07.18	12	Did not advance	
Miho Takahashi	400 m individual medley	4:37.33	=10	—N/a		Did not advance	
Miho Teramura	200 m individual medley	2:10.34	5 Q	2:11.03	9	Did not advance	
Miki Uchida	100 m freestyle	54.50	=16 Q	54.39	14	Did not advance	
Kanako Watanabe	100 m breaststroke	1:07.22	16 Q	1:07.43	15	Did not advance	
Kanako Watanabe	200 m breaststroke	2:24.77	13 Q	2:25.10	14	Did not advance	
Rikako Ikee; Yayoi Matsumoto; Miki Uchida; Misaki Yamaguchi	4 × 100 m freestyle relay	3:36.74 NR	7 Q	—N/a		3:37.78	8
Tomomi Aoki; Chihiro Igarashi; Rikako Ikee; Sachi Mochida	4 × 200 m freestyle relay	7:52.50	7 Q	—N/a		7:56.76	8
Rikako Ikee; Natsumi Sakai; Miki Uchida; Kanako Watanabe	4 × 100 m medley relay	3:59.82	10	—N/a		Did not advance	

== Synchronized swimming ==
Japan has fielded a squad of nine synchronized swimmers to compete in both the women's team and duet routine by virtue of their second-place finish at the FINA Olympic test event in Rio de Janeiro.

Athlete	Event	Technical routine		Free routine (preliminary)			Free routine (final)		
Athlete	Event	Points	Rank	Points	Total (technical + free)	Rank	Points	Total (technical + free)	Rank
Yukiko Inui; Risako Mitsui	Duet	93.1214	4	94.4000	187.5214	3 Q	94.9333	188.0547	3rd place, bronze medalist(s)
Aika Hakoyama; Aiko Hayashi; Yukiko Inui; Kei Marumo; Risako Mitsui; Kanami Nakamaki; Mai Nakamura; Kano Omata; Kurumi Yoshida	Team	93.7723	3	—N/a			95.4333	189.2056	3rd place, bronze medalist(s)

== Table tennis ==
Japan has fielded a team of six athletes into the table tennis competition at the Games. Jun Mizutani, Koki Niwa, and London 2012 silver medalists Ai Fukuhara and Kasumi Ishikawa were automatically selected among the top 22 eligible players each in their respective singles events based on the ITTF Olympic Rankings.

Maharu Yoshimura and Mima Ito were each awarded the third spot to build the men's and women's teams for the Games by virtue of a top 10 national finish in the ITTF Olympic Rankings.

Men

Athlete	Event	Preliminary	Round 1	Round 2	Round 3	Round of 16	Quarterfinals	Semifinals	Final / BM	
Athlete	Event	Opposition Result	Opposition Result	Opposition Result	Opposition Result	Opposition Result	Opposition Result	Opposition Result	Opposition Result	Rank
Jun Mizutani	Singles	Bye			Gionis (GRE); W 4–1	Calderano (BRA); W 4–2	Freitas (POR); W 4–2	Ma L (CHN); L 2–4	Samsonov (BLR); W 4–1	3rd place, bronze medalist(s)
Koki Niwa	Singles	Bye		Toriola (NGR); W 4–2	Fegerl (AUT); W 4–1	Wong C T (HKG); W 4–3	Zhang Jk (CHN); L 1–4	Did not advance		
Jun Mizutani; Koki Niwa; Maharu Yoshimura	Team	—N/a				Poland; W 3–2	Hong Kong; W 3–1	Germany; W 3–1	China; L 1–3	2nd place, silver medalist(s)

Women

Athlete	Event	Round 1	Round 2	Round 3	Round 4	Round of 16	Quarterfinals	Semifinals	Final / BM	
Athlete	Event	Opposition Result	Opposition Result	Opposition Result	Opposition Result	Opposition Result	Opposition Result	Opposition Result	Opposition Result	Rank
Ai Fukuhara	Singles	Bye			Dodean (ROU); W 4–0	Ri M-s (PRK); W 4–0	Feng Tw (SIN); W 4–0	Li Xx (CHN); L 0–4	Kim S-i (PRK); L 1–4	4
Kasumi Ishikawa	Singles	Bye			Kim S-i (PRK); L 3–4	Did not advance				
Ai Fukuhara; Kasumi Ishikawa; Mima Ito	Team	—N/a				Poland; W 3–0	Austria; W 3–0	Germany; L 2–3	Singapore; W 3–1	3rd place, bronze medalist(s)

== Taekwondo ==
Japan entered one athlete into the taekwondo competition at the Olympics. 2012 Olympian Mayu Hamada qualified automatically for the women's lightweight category (57 kg) by finishing in the top 6 WTF Olympic rankings.

Athlete	Event	Round of 16	Quarterfinals	Semifinals	Repechage	Final / BM	
Athlete	Event	Opposition Result	Opposition Result	Opposition Result	Opposition Result	Opposition Result	Rank
Mayu Hamada	Women's −57 kg	Ben Ali (TUN); W 9–0	Malak (EGY); L 0–3 SUD	Did not advance			

== Tennis ==
Japan has entered two tennis players into the Olympic tournament. Asia's tennis star and London 2012 quarterfinalist Kei Nishikori (world no. 6), along with Misaki Doi (world no. 48) and Nao Hibino (world no. 69), qualified directly among the top 56 eligible players for their respective singles events based on the ATP and WTA World Rankings as of 6 June 2016. Having been directly entered to the singles, Doi also opted to play with her rookie partner Eri Hozumi in the women's doubles. Following the withdrawal of several tennis players from the Games, Yūichi Sugita (world no. 106) and Taro Daniel (world no. 108) received a spare ITF Olympic places to join Nishikori in the men's singles.

Athlete	Event	Round of 64	Round of 32	Round of 16	Quarterfinals	Semifinals	Final / BM	
Athlete	Event	Opposition Score	Opposition Score	Opposition Score	Opposition Score	Opposition Score	Opposition Score	Rank
Taro Daniel	Men's singles	Sock (USA); W 6–4, 6–4	Edmund (GBR); W 6–4, 7–5	del Potro (ARG); L 6–7^{(4–7)}, 6–1, 2–6	Did not advance			
Kei Nishikori	Men's singles	Ramos (ESP); W 6–2, 6–4	Millman (AUS); W 7–6^{(7–4)}, 6–4	Martin (SVK); W 6–2, 6–2	Monfils (FRA); W 7–6^{(7–4)}, 4–6, 7–6^{(8–6)}	Murray (GBR); L 1–6, 4–6	Nadal (ESP); W 6–2, 6–7^{(1–7)}, 6–3	3rd place, bronze medalist(s)
Yūichi Sugita	Men's singles	Baker (USA); W 5–7, 7–5, 6–4	Simon (FRA); L 6–7^{(3–7)}, 2–6	Did not advance				
Misaki Doi	Women's singles	Shvedova (KAZ); W 6–3, 6–4	Stosur (AUS); L 3–6, 4–6	Did not advance				
Nao Hibino	Women's singles	Begu (ROU); W 6–4, 3–6, 6–3	Muguruza (ESP); L 1–6, 1–6	Did not advance				
Misaki Doi; Eri Hozumi	Women's doubles	—N/a	Garcia / Mladenovic (FRA); W 6–0, 0–6, 6–4	Kasatkina / Kuznetsova (RUS); L 4–6, 6–1, 1–6	Did not advance			

== Triathlon ==
Japan has qualified a total of four triathletes for the following events at the Games. Incoming four-time Olympian Hirokatsu Tayama and Ai Ueda secured their Olympic spots in the men's and women's triathlon, respectively, as a result of their gold medal triumph at the 2016 Asian Championships in Hatsukaichi. Meanwhile, Ueda's teammates Yurie Kato and 2010 Youth Olympic gold medalist Yuka Sato were ranked among the top 40 eligible triathletes in the women's event based on the ITU Olympic Qualification List as of 15 May 2016.

Athlete	Event	Swim (1.5 km)	Trans 1	Bike (40 km)	Trans 2	Run (10 km)	Total Time	Rank
Hirokatsu Tayama	Men's	17:34	0:47	Lapped				
Yurie Kato	Women's	20:06	0:56	1:07:13	0:42	35:53	2:07:50	46
Yuka Sato	Women's	19:08	0:58	1:01:24	0:38	37:53	2:00:01	15
Ai Ueda	Women's	21:10	0:57	1:04:50	0:37	36:03	2:03:37	39

== Volleyball ==
=== Indoor ===
==== Women's tournament ====
Japan women's volleyball team qualified for the Olympics by picking up the continental spot as the highest-ranked Asian team at the first meet of the World Olympic Qualifying Tournament in Tokyo.

Team roster

The following is the Japanese roster in the women's volleyball tournament of the 2016 Summer Olympics.

Head coach: Masayoshi Manabe

No.	Name	Date of birth	Height	Weight	Spike	Block	2015–16 club
1	Miyu Nagaoka	25 July 1991	1.79 m (5 ft 10 in)	68 kg (150 lb)	310 cm (120 in)	298 cm (117 in)	(Japan) Hisamitsu Springs
2	Haruka Miyashita	1 September 1994	1.77 m (5 ft 10 in)	61 kg (134 lb)	298 cm (117 in)	272 cm (107 in)	(Japan) Okayama Seagulls
3	Saori Kimura (c)	19 August 1986	1.85 m (6 ft 1 in)	65 kg (143 lb)	304 cm (120 in)	293 cm (115 in)	(Japan) Toray Arrows
5	Arisa Satō (L)	18 July 1989	1.64 m (5 ft 5 in)	52 kg (115 lb)	275 cm (108 in)	266 cm (105 in)	(Japan) Hitachi Rivale
6	Yurie Nabeya	15 December 1993	1.76 m (5 ft 9 in)	58 kg (128 lb)	302 cm (119 in)	285 cm (112 in)	(Japan) Denso Airybees
7	Mai Yamaguchi	3 July 1983	1.76 m (5 ft 9 in)	62 kg (137 lb)	304 cm (120 in)	292 cm (115 in)	(Japan) Okayama Seagulls
9	Haruyo Shimamura	4 March 1992	1.82 m (6 ft 0 in)	79 kg (174 lb)	299 cm (118 in)	290 cm (110 in)	(Japan) NEC Red Rockets
11	Erika Araki	3 August 1984	1.86 m (6 ft 1 in)	78 kg (172 lb)	304 cm (120 in)	301 cm (119 in)	(Japan) Toyota Queenseis
12	Yuki Ishii	8 May 1991	1.80 m (5 ft 11 in)	68 kg (150 lb)	302 cm (119 in)	286 cm (113 in)	(Japan) Hisamitsu Springs
16	Saori Sakoda	18 December 1987	1.75 m (5 ft 9 in)	63 kg (139 lb)	305 cm (120 in)	279 cm (110 in)	(Japan) Toray Arrows
18	Kotoki Zayasu	11 January 1990	1.59 m (5 ft 3 in)	57 kg (126 lb)	270 cm (110 in)	255 cm (100 in)	(Japan) Hisamitsu Springs
20	Kanami Tashiro	25 March 1991	1.73 m (5 ft 8 in)	66 kg (146 lb)	283 cm (111 in)	273 cm (107 in)	(Japan) Toray Arrows

Group play

Pos	Team	Pld	W	L	Pts	SW	SL	SR	SPW	SPL	SPR	Qualification
1	Brazil (H)	5	5	0	15	15	0	MAX	377	272	1.386	Quarter-finals
2	Russia	5	4	1	12	12	4	3.000	393	323	1.217	Quarter-finals
3	South Korea	5	3	2	9	10	7	1.429	384	372	1.032	Quarter-finals
4	Japan	5	2	3	6	7	9	0.778	347	364	0.953	Quarter-finals
5	Argentina	5	1	4	2	3	14	0.214	319	407	0.784	
6	Cameroon	5	0	5	1	2	15	0.133	328	410	0.800	

Source: FIVB
Rules for classification: Tiebreakers
(H) Host

6 August 2016; 09:30	Japan	1–3	South Korea	Ginásio do Maracanãzinho, Rio de Janeiro; Attendance: 5,760; Referees: Denny Cespedes (DOM), Patricia Rolf (USA)
6 August 2016; 09:30	(25–19, 15–25, 17–25, 21–25); Result Statistics			Ginásio do Maracanãzinho, Rio de Janeiro; Attendance: 5,760; Referees: Denny Cespedes (DOM), Patricia Rolf (USA)

8 August 2016; 11:35	Japan	3–0	Cameroon	Ginásio do Maracanãzinho, Rio de Janeiro; Attendance: 5,400; Referees: Rogerio Espicalsky (BRA), Hernán Casamiquela (ARG)
8 August 2016; 11:35	(25–20, 25–15, 25–17); Result Statistics			Ginásio do Maracanãzinho, Rio de Janeiro; Attendance: 5,400; Referees: Rogerio Espicalsky (BRA), Hernán Casamiquela (ARG)

10 August 2016; 22:35	Brazil	3–0	Japan	Ginásio do Maracanãzinho, Rio de Janeiro; Attendance: 8,759; Referees: Susana Rodríguez (ESP), Luís Macias (MEX)
10 August 2016; 22:35	(25–18, 25–18, 25–22); Result Statistics			Ginásio do Maracanãzinho, Rio de Janeiro; Attendance: 8,759; Referees: Susana Rodríguez (ESP), Luís Macias (MEX)

12 August 2016; 20:30	Russia	3–0	Japan	Ginásio do Maracanãzinho, Rio de Janeiro; Attendance: 7,448; Referees: Mohammad Shahmiri (IRI), Heike Kraft (GER)
12 August 2016; 20:30	(25–14, 30–28, 25–18); Result Statistics			Ginásio do Maracanãzinho, Rio de Janeiro; Attendance: 7,448; Referees: Mohammad Shahmiri (IRI), Heike Kraft (GER)

14 August 2016; 20:30	Japan	3–0	Argentina	Ginásio do Maracanãzinho, Rio de Janeiro; Attendance: 5,939; Referees: Denny Cespedes (DOM), Fabrizio Pasquali (ITA)
14 August 2016; 20:30	(25–23, 25–16, 26–24); Result Statistics			Ginásio do Maracanãzinho, Rio de Janeiro; Attendance: 5,939; Referees: Denny Cespedes (DOM), Fabrizio Pasquali (ITA)

Quarterfinal

16 August 2016; 14:00	Japan	0–3	United States	Ginásio do Maracanãzinho, Rio de Janeiro; Attendance: 7,226; Referees: Paulo Turci (BRA), Heike Kraft (GER)
16 August 2016; 14:00	(16–25, 23–25, 22–25); Result Statistics			Ginásio do Maracanãzinho, Rio de Janeiro; Attendance: 7,226; Referees: Paulo Turci (BRA), Heike Kraft (GER)

== Water polo ==
Summary

Key:

- FT – After full time.
- P – Match decided by penalty-shootout.

Team	Event	Group Stage						Quarterfinal	Semifinal	Final / BM	
Team	Event	Opposition Score	Opposition Score	Opposition Score	Opposition Score	Opposition Score	Rank	Opposition Score	Opposition Score	Opposition Score	Rank
Japan men's	Men's tournament	Greece; L 7–8	Australia; L 8–16	Brazil; L 6–8	Hungary; L 7–17	Serbia; L 8–12	6	Did not advance			12

=== Men's tournament ===
Japan men's water polo team qualified for the Olympics by winning the gold medal and securing a lone outright berth at the Asian Championships in Foshan, China, signifying the nation's Olympic comeback to the men's tournament for the first time since 1984.

Team roster

The following is the Japanese roster in the men's water polo tournament of the 2016 Summer Olympics.

Head coach: Yoji Omoto

№	Name	Pos.	Height	Weight	Date of birth	2016 club
1	Katsuyuki Tanamura	GK	1.84 m (6 ft 0 in)	84 kg (185 lb)	3 August 1989	(Japan) Bourbon WP Club
2	Seiya Adachi	D	1.72 m (5 ft 8 in)	67 kg (148 lb)	24 June 1995	(Japan) Nippon Sport
3	Atsushi Arai	D	1.68 m (5 ft 6 in)	62 kg (137 lb)	3 February 1994	(Japan) Nippon Sport
4	Mitsuaki Shiga	D	1.77 m (5 ft 10 in)	75 kg (165 lb)	16 September 1991	(Japan) All-Nittaidai
5	Akira Yanase	CF	1.90 m (6 ft 3 in)	95 kg (209 lb)	11 August 1988	(Japan) All-Nittaidai
6	Atsuto Iida	CB	1.81 m (5 ft 11 in)	82 kg (181 lb)	24 December 1993	(Japan) Nippon Sport
7	Yusuke Shimizu (c)	CF	1.81 m (5 ft 11 in)	85 kg (187 lb)	7 September 1988	(Japan) Bourbon WP Club
8	Yuki Kadono	D	1.77 m (5 ft 10 in)	72 kg (159 lb)	14 September 1990	(Japan) All-Nittaidai
9	Koji Takei	D	1.76 m (5 ft 9 in)	78 kg (172 lb)	30 July 1990	(Japan) All-Nittaidai
10	Kenya Yasuda	CB	1.82 m (6 ft 0 in)	77 kg (170 lb)	29 March 1989	(Japan) Bourbon WP Club
11	Keigo Okawa	CB	1.83 m (6 ft 0 in)	96 kg (212 lb)	11 March 1990	(Japan) All-Nittaidai
12	Shota Hazui	D	1.77 m (5 ft 10 in)	77 kg (170 lb)	30 September 1986	(Japan) Bourbon WP Club
13	Tomoyoshi Fukushima	GK	1.77 m (5 ft 10 in)	75 kg (165 lb)	3 June 1993	(Japan) Nippon Sport

Group play

Pos	Team	Pld	W	D	L	GF	GA	GD	Pts	Qualification
1	Hungary	5	2	3	0	57	43	+14	7	Quarter-finals
2	Greece	5	2	2	1	41	40	+1	6	Quarter-finals
3	Brazil (H)	5	3	0	2	40	39	+1	6	Quarter-finals
4	Serbia	5	2	2	1	49	44	+5	6	Quarter-finals
5	Australia	5	2	1	2	44	40	+4	5	
6	Japan	5	0	0	5	36	61	−25	0	

Source: Rio2016
Rules for classification: 1) Points; 2) Head-to-head points; 3) Head-to-head goal difference; 4) Head-to-head goals scored; 5) Goal difference.
(H) Hosts

6 August 2016; 13:00	Report	Greece	8–7	Japan	Maria Lenk Aquatic Center, Rio de Janeiro; Referees: Sergey Naumov (RUS), Stanko Ivanovski (MNE)
6 August 2016; 13:00	Report	Score by quarters: 2–2, 2–1, 0–4, 4–0			Maria Lenk Aquatic Center, Rio de Janeiro; Referees: Sergey Naumov (RUS), Stanko Ivanovski (MNE)
6 August 2016; 13:00	Report	Vlachopoulos 3	Goals	three players 2	Maria Lenk Aquatic Center, Rio de Janeiro; Referees: Sergey Naumov (RUS), Stanko Ivanovski (MNE)

8 August 2016; 19:30	Report	Japan	8–16	Brazil	Maria Lenk Aquatic Center, Rio de Janeiro; Referees: Nenad Peris (CRO), Francesc Buch (ESP)
8 August 2016; 19:30	Report	Score by quarters: 2–5, 1–3, 4–4, 1–4			Maria Lenk Aquatic Center, Rio de Janeiro; Referees: Nenad Peris (CRO), Francesc Buch (ESP)
8 August 2016; 19:30	Report	three players 2	Goals	Vrlić 5	Maria Lenk Aquatic Center, Rio de Janeiro; Referees: Nenad Peris (CRO), Francesc Buch (ESP)

10 August 2016; 09:00	Report	Australia	8–6	Japan	Maria Lenk Aquatic Center, Rio de Janeiro; Referees: Francesc Buch (ESP), Joseph Peila (USA)
10 August 2016; 09:00	Report	Score by quarters: 1–2, 2–1, 3–2, 2–1			Maria Lenk Aquatic Center, Rio de Janeiro; Referees: Francesc Buch (ESP), Joseph Peila (USA)
10 August 2016; 09:00	Report	Kayes 4	Goals	Okawa, Takei 2	Maria Lenk Aquatic Center, Rio de Janeiro; Referees: Francesc Buch (ESP), Joseph Peila (USA)

12 August 2016; 09:00	Report	Hungary	17–7	Japan	Maria Lenk Aquatic Center, Rio de Janeiro; Referees: Stanko Ivanovski (MNE), Masoud Rezvani (IRI)
12 August 2016; 09:00	Report	Score by quarters: 5–1, 6–2, 2–2, 4–2			Maria Lenk Aquatic Center, Rio de Janeiro; Referees: Stanko Ivanovski (MNE), Masoud Rezvani (IRI)
12 August 2016; 09:00	Report	Kis 5	Goals	Takei 3	Maria Lenk Aquatic Center, Rio de Janeiro; Referees: Stanko Ivanovski (MNE), Masoud Rezvani (IRI)

14 August 2016; 19:30	Report	Serbia	12–8	Japan	Olympic Aquatics Stadium, Rio de Janeiro; Referees: Nenad Peris (CRO), Benjamin Mercier (FRA)
14 August 2016; 19:30	Report	Score by quarters: 2–5, 3–0, 4–2, 3–1			Olympic Aquatics Stadium, Rio de Janeiro; Referees: Nenad Peris (CRO), Benjamin Mercier (FRA)
14 August 2016; 19:30	Report	Filipović 6	Goals	Takei 5	Olympic Aquatics Stadium, Rio de Janeiro; Referees: Nenad Peris (CRO), Benjamin Mercier (FRA)

== Weightlifting ==
Japanese weightlifters have qualified three men's and four women's quota places for the Rio Olympics based on their combined team standing by points at the 2014 and 2015 IWF World Championships. The team must allocate these places to individual athletes by 20 June 2016.

The weightlifting team was named to the Olympic roster on 28 May 2016, with London 2012 silver medalist Hiromi Miyake remarkably going to her fourth straight Games. Two further places were added to the Japanese weightlifting squad, as a response to Azerbaijan's omission from the ranking list published at the World Championships, due to "multiple positive cases" of doping on the nation's weightlifters.

Men

Athlete	Event	Snatch		Clean & Jerk		Total	Rank
Athlete	Event	Result	Rank	Result	Rank	Total	Rank
Hiroaki Takao	−56 kg	111	12	138	11	249	11
Yōichi Itokazu	−62 kg	133	4	169	4	302	4
Yōsuke Nakayama	−62 kg	121	11	145	12	266	12

Women

Athlete	Event	Snatch		Clean & Jerk		Total	Rank
Athlete	Event	Result	Rank	Result	Rank	Total	Rank
Hiromi Miyake	−48 kg	81	8	107	3	188	3rd place, bronze medalist(s)
Kanae Yagi	−53 kg	81	6	105	6	186	6
Mikiko Ando	−58 kg	94	7	124	4	218	5
Namika Matsumoto	−63 kg	90	10	115	9	205	9

== Wrestling ==
Japan has qualified a total of ten wrestlers for each of the following weight classes into the Olympic competition. Majority of Olympic berths were awarded to Japanese female wrestlers, who finished among the top six at the 2015 World Championships, while five more had booked their Olympic spots by progressing to the top two finals at the 2016 Asian Qualification Tournament.

Key:

- VT – Victory by fall.
- VB – Victory by injury.
- PP – Decision by points – the loser with technical points.
- PO – Decision by points – the loser without technical points.
- ST – Great superiority – the loser without technical points and a margin of victory of at least 8 (Greco-Roman) or 10 (freestyle) points.
- SP – Technical superiority – the loser with technical points and a margin of victory of at least 8 (Greco-Roman) or 10 (freestyle) points.

Men's freestyle

Athlete	Event	Qualification	Round of 16	Quarterfinal	Semifinal	Repechage 1	Repechage 2	Final / BM	
Athlete	Event	Opposition Result	Opposition Result	Opposition Result	Opposition Result	Opposition Result	Opposition Result	Opposition Result	Rank
Rei Higuchi	−57 kg	Yang K-i (PRK); W 4–1 ^{SP}	Lachinau (BLR); W 4–0 ^{ST}	Bonne (CUB); W 3–1 ^{PP}	Rahimi (IRI); W 3–1 ^{PP}	Bye		Khinchegashvili (GEO); L 1–3 ^{PP}	2nd place, silver medalist(s)
Sohsuke Takatani	−74 kg	Ilyasov (AUS); W 5–0 ^{VB}	Khadjiev (FRA); W 3–1 ^{PP}	Usserbayev (KAZ); L 1–3 ^{PP}	Did not advance				7

Men's Greco-Roman

Athlete	Event	Qualification	Round of 16	Quarterfinal	Semifinal	Repechage 1	Repechage 2	Final / BM	
Athlete	Event	Opposition Result	Opposition Result	Opposition Result	Opposition Result	Opposition Result	Opposition Result	Opposition Result	Rank
Shinobu Ota	−59 kg	Sourian (IRI); W 3–1 ^{PP}	Kebispayev (KAZ); W 3–0 ^{PO}	Berge (NOR); W 3–0 ^{PO}	Bayramov (AZE); W 5–0 ^{VT}	Bye		Borrero (CUB); L 0–4 ^{ST}	2nd place, silver medalist(s)
Tomohiro Inoue	−66 kg	Bye	Štefanek (SRB); L 0–4 ^{ST}	Did not advance		Bye	Stäbler (GER); W 3–1 ^{PP}	Bolkvadze (GEO); L 0–3 ^{PO}	5

Women's freestyle

Athlete	Event	Qualification	Round of 16	Quarterfinal	Semifinal	Repechage 1	Repechage 2	Final / BM	
Athlete	Event	Opposition Result	Opposition Result	Opposition Result	Opposition Result	Opposition Result	Opposition Result	Opposition Result	Rank
Eri Tosaka	−48 kg	Bye	Eshimova (KAZ); W 3–0 ^{PO}	Augello (USA); W 3–1 ^{PP}	Sun Yn (CHN); W 3–1 ^{PP}	Bye		Stadnik (AZE); W 3–1 ^{PP}	1st place, gold medalist(s)
Saori Yoshida	−53 kg	Bye	Synyshyn (AZE); W 3–0 ^{PO}	Sambou (SEN); W 3–0 ^{PO}	Argüello (VEN); W 3–0 ^{PO}	Bye		Maroulis (USA); L 1–3 ^{PP}	2nd place, silver medalist(s)
Kaori Icho	−58 kg	Bye	Amri (TUN); W 4–0 ^{ST}	Yeşilırmak (TUR); W 3–1 ^{PP}	Ratkevich (AZE); W 4–0 ^{ST}	Bye		Koblova (RUS); W 3–1 ^{PP}	1st place, gold medalist(s)
Risako Kawai	−63 kg	Bye	Michalik (POL); W 3–0 ^{PO}	Grigorjeva (LAT); W 3–0 ^{PO}	Trazhukova (RUS); W 3–0 ^{PO}	Bye		Mamashuk (BLR); W 3–0 ^{PO}	1st place, gold medalist(s)
Sara Dosho	−69 kg	Stadnyk (UKR); W 3–1 ^{PP}	Tosun (TUR); W 4–0 ^{ST}	Yeats (CAN); W 3–1 ^{PP}	Fransson (SWE); W 3–1 ^{PP}	Bye		Vorobieva (RUS); W 3–1 ^{PP}	1st place, gold medalist(s)
Rio Watari	−75 kg	Bye	Ferreira (BRA); L 1–3 ^{PP}	Did not advance					14

== See also ==
- Japan at the 2016 Summer Paralympics
