= Soichiro Fujitaka =

Japanese basketball player (born 1991)

Soichiro Fujitaka 藤高宗一郎
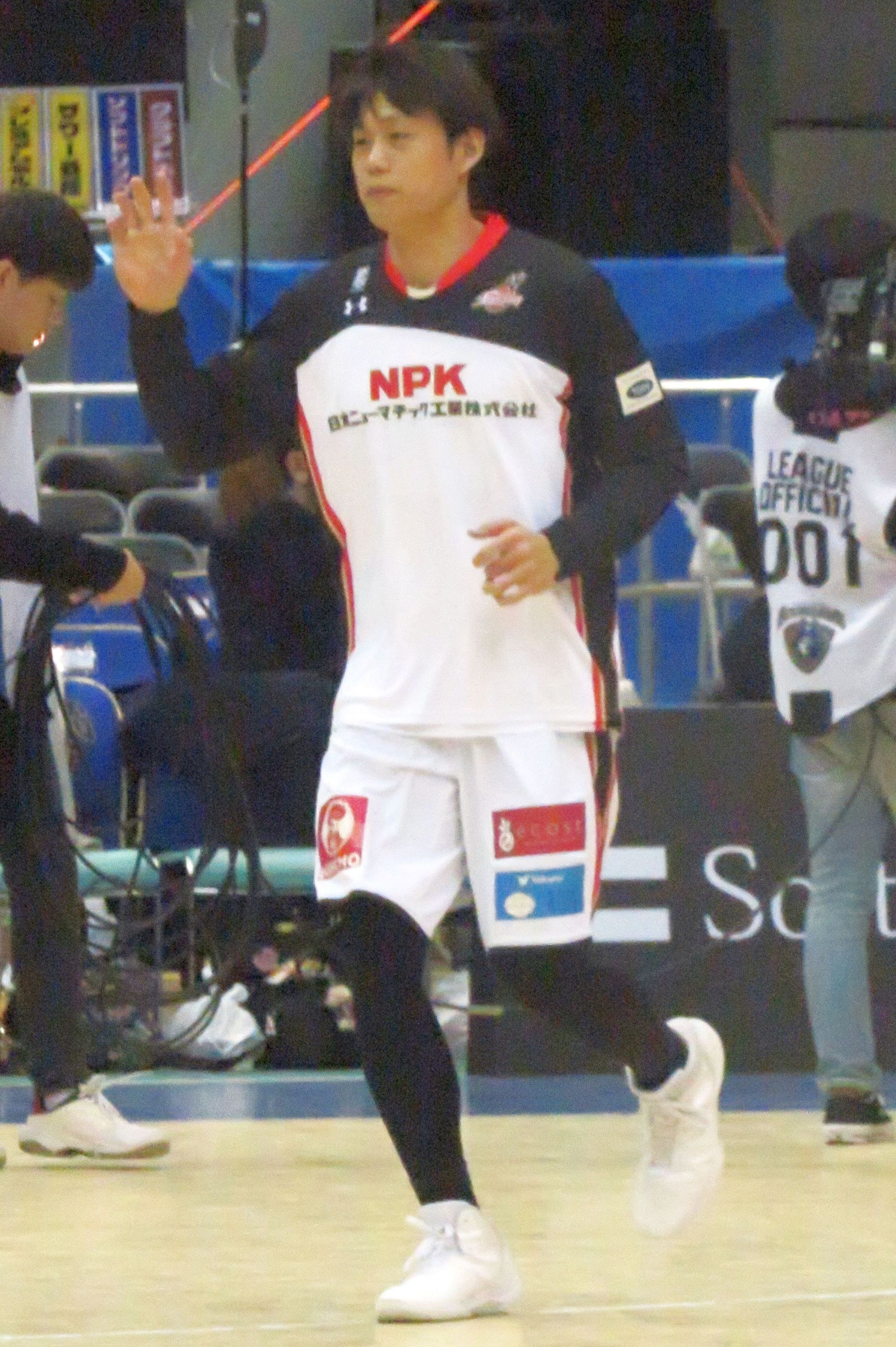
- Fujitaka in 2018

No. 3 – Bambitious Nara
- Position: Forward
- League: B.League, FIBA 3X3

Personal information
- Born: October 11, 1991 (age 35) Suminoe-ku, Osaka
- Listed height: 6 ft 3 in (1.91 m)
- Listed weight: 201 lb (91 kg)

Career information
- High school: Osaka University of Commerce High School (Higashiōsaka, Osaka)
- College: Kansai University
- Playing career: 2014–present

Career history
- 2014-2017: Hitachi Sunrockers
- 2017-2020: Osaka Evessa
- 2020-present: Bambitious Nara

Soichiro Fujitaka
- Spouse: Mika Kurihara (m. 2017)

Soichiro Fujitaka (藤髙 宗一郎, Fujitaka Sōichirō; born October 11, 1991), nicknamed So, is a Japanese professional basketball player who plays for Bambitious Nara of the B.League in Japan. He also plays for Japan men's national 3x3 team.

== Non-FIBA Events statistics ==
| Year | Team | GP | GS | MPG | FG% | 3P% | FT% | RPG | APG | SPG | BPG | PPG |
|---|---|---|---|---|---|---|---|---|---|---|---|---|
| 2013 | Universiade Japan | 7 | | 15.10 | .550 | .250 | .733 | 2.7 | 1.3 | 0.7 | 0.0 | 5.1 |

== Career statistics ==
Legend
| GP | Games played | GS | Games started | MPG | Minutes per game |
| FG% | Field goal percentage | 3P% | 3-point field goal percentage | FT% | Free throw percentage |
| RPG | Rebounds per game | APG | Assists per game | SPG | Steals per game |
| BPG | Blocks per game | PPG | Points per game | **Bold** | Career high |

=== Regular season ===
| Year | Team | GP | GS | MPG | FG% | 3P% | FT% | RPG | APG | SPG | BPG | PPG |
|---|---|---|---|---|---|---|---|---|---|---|---|---|
| 2011–12 | Nippon Tornadoes | 1 | 1 | 48.0 | .304 | .000 | .250 | 7.0 | 1.0 | 1.0 | 0.0 | 15.0 |
| 2014–15 | Hitachi | 37 | 1 | 9.1 | .417 | .190 | .586 | 1.1 | 0.2 | 0.2 | 0.1 | 2.9 |
| 2015–16 | Hitachi | 30 | | 6.9 | .440 | .400 | .769 | 0.8 | 0.3 | 0.2 | 0.1 | 2.0 |
| 2016–17 | Shibuya | 57 | 2 | 8.9 | .430 | .367 | .619 | 1.2 | 0.4 | 0.2 | 0.0 | 1.9 |
| 2017–18 | Osaka | 49 | 9 | 14.5 | .439 | .292 | .745 | 1.2 | 1.2 | 0.5 | 0.1 | 4.4 |
| 2018–19 | Osaka | 60 | 12 | 15.9 | .398 | .283 | .492 | 1.1 | 0.9 | 0.3 | 0.1 | 3.7 |

=== Early cup games ===
| Year | Team | GP | GS | MPG | FG% | 3P% | FT% | RPG | APG | SPG | BPG | PPG |
|---|---|---|---|---|---|---|---|---|---|---|---|---|
| 2017 | Osaka | 3 | 0 | 15.17 | .625 | 1.000 | .667 | 1.7 | 0.7 | 0 | 0 | 4.3 |
| 2018 | Osaka | 2 | 2 | 20.03 | .444 | .000 | .500 | 3.0 | 1.0 | 0.5 | 0 | 5.0 |

== Personal ==
He married Mika Kurihara, a professional basketball player for the Toyota Antelopes, in 2017.
