= Osamu Kuraishi =

Waseda University Big Bears
- Position: General manager

Personal information
- Born: April 20, 1956 (age 70) Niigata Prefecture
- Listed height: 6 ft 2 in (1.88 m)

Career information
- High school: Waseda Jitsugyo (Kokubunji, Tokyo)
- College: Waseda University
- Coaching career: 1989–present

Career history

Playing
- 1979-1987: Kumagai Gumi Bruins

Coaching
- 1989-1994: Kumagai Gumi Bruins
- 1994-1998: Daiwa Securities
- 2001-2004: Hitachi SunRockers
- 2009: Japan national basketball team

Career highlights
- 2x JBL Champions

Osamu Kuraishi (倉石平, Kuraishi Osamu) is the former head coach of the Hitachi SunRockers.

== Head coaching record ==
Legend
Regular season	G	Games coached	W	Games won	L	Games lost	W–L %	Win–loss %
Playoffs	PG	Playoff games	PW	Playoff wins	PL	Playoff losses	PW–L %	Playoff win–loss %

Team	Year	G	W	L	W–L%	Finish	PG	PW	PL	PW–L%	Result
Daiwa Securities	1994	16	7	9	.438	4th in C	-	-	-	–	7th
Daiwa Securities	1995	16	8	8	.500	4th in C	-	-	-	–	4th
Daiwa Securities	1996	16	9	7	.563	3rd in T	-	-	-	–	4th
Daiwa Securities	1997	16	7	9	.438	2nd in C	-	-	-	–	3rd
Daiwa Securities	1998	16	8	8	.500	3rd in C	-	-	-	–	4th
Hitachi SunRockers	2001	21	2	19	.095	8th	-	-	-	–	8th
Hitachi SunRockers	2002	21	8	13	.381	7th	-	-	-	–	7th
Hitachi SunRockers	2003	28	11	17	.393	7th	-	-	-	–	7th
Hitachi SunRockers	2004	28	8	20	.286	8th	-	-	-	–	8th
