= Kumagai Gumi Bruins =

Japanese basketball team

- Leagues: JBL
- Founded: 1952
- Folded: 1994
- Location: Tokyo
- Ownership: Kumagai Gumi
- Championships: 2

The Kumagai Gumi Bruins were a Japanese basketball team that played in the Japan Basketball League. They were based in Tokyo.

== Notable players ==
- Toshihiro Goto
- Moses Scurry
- Harvest Smith

== Coaches ==
- Osamu Kuraishi
