= Toshihiro Goto =

Japanese basketball player

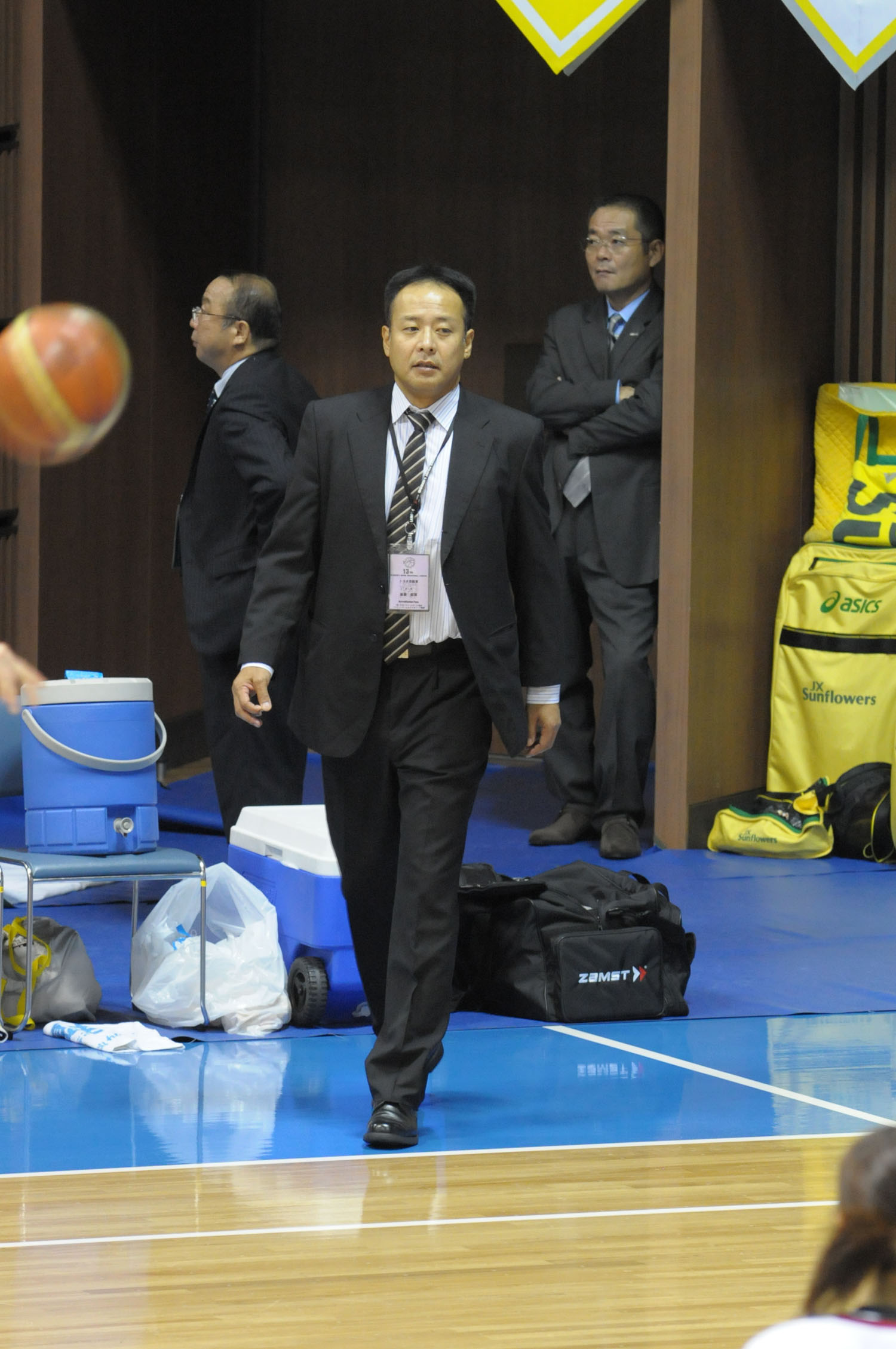

Personal information
- Born: September 10, 1966 (age 60) Fukuoka, Fukuoka
- Listed height: 190 cm (6 ft 3 in)
- Listed weight: 83 kg (183 lb)

Career information
- High school: Shuyukan (Fukuoka, Fukuoka)
- College: Chuo University
- Playing career: 1989–1999
- Position: Head coach

Career history

Playing
- 1989-1994: Kumagai Gumi Bruins
- 1994-1999: Isuzu Motors

Coaching
- 2000-2005: Toyota Antelopes (asst)
- 2005: Fukuoka Red Falcons
- 2006-2012: Toyota Antelopes (asst)
- 2012-2015: Toyota Antelopes
- 2016: Asahigaoka JHS
- 2017: Sendai 89ers

Career highlights
- 5x JBL Champions
Medals
Men's basketball
Representing Japan
FIBA Asia Champions Cup
Silver medal – second place	1996 Manila	Japan

Toshihiro Goto (後藤敏博, Goto Toshihiro) is the former Head coach of the Sendai 89ers in the Japanese B.League.

== Head coaching record ==
Legend
Regular season	G	Games coached	W	Games won	L	Games lost	W–L %	Win–loss %
Playoffs	PG	Playoff games	PW	Playoff wins	PL	Playoff losses	PW–L %	Playoff win–loss %

Team	Year	G	W	L	W–L%	Finish	PG	PW	PL	PW–L%	Result
Toyota Antelopes	2012-13	29	22	7	.759	2nd	6	3	3	.500	Runners-up
Toyota Antelopes	2013-14	33	26	7	.788	2nd	3	1	2	.333	3rd
Toyota Antelopes	2014-15	30	20	10	.667	4th	2	0	2	.000	4th
Sendai 89ers	2017	28	13	15	.464	Fired	-	-	-	–	-
