= Leroy Smith (basketball) =

American basketball player

Harvest Leroy Smith
Personal information
- Born: February 27, 1963 (age 63) Philadelphia, Pennsylvania, U.S.
- Listed height: 6 ft 8 in (2.03 m)
- Listed weight: 215 lb (98 kg)

Career information
- High school: Emsley A. Laney (Wilmington, North Carolina)
- College: Charlotte (1981–1985)
- NBA draft: 1985: undrafted
- Playing career: 1985–1990
- Position: Forward / center

Career history
- 1985–1986: Hemel & Watford Royals
- 1986: Westchester Golden Apples
- 1986–1987: TuS Bramsche
- 1987–1988: AST Tarrare
- 1988–1990: Kumagai Gumi Bruins

Harvest Leroy Smith Jr. (born February 27, 1963) is a retired American professional basketball player, businessperson and former high school teammate of National Basketball Association (NBA) star Michael Jordan.

== Early years ==
Smith was born and raised in Philadelphia, Pennsylvania, before moving to Wilmington, North Carolina in 1972 with his family.

== High school ==
Smith and Michael Jordan were childhood friends who played together on their ninth-grade basketball squad. In 1978, during their second year at Emsley A. Laney High School, both tried out for the lone sophomore opening on the varsity basketball team. Smith, who was 6 ft 7 in (2.01 m), was selected because of his height, while the 5-foot-11-inch (1.80 m) Jordan was sent to the JV basketball team by coach Clifton "Pop”" Herring. Jordan trained extensively over the next year, grew four inches and was selected for the varsity team as a junior exhibiting extraordinary competitive passion.

In 1991, Jordan acknowledged the impact of the event, "It all started when Coach Herring cut me. What it did was instill some values in me. It was a lesson to me to dig within myself." Jordan would check into hotels under the alias “Leroy Smith” throughout his professional basketball career.

== College ==
Smith attended the University of North Carolina at Charlotte from 1981 to 1985, earning a Bachelor of Arts degree in Psychology. He had a four-year basketball scholarship, playing at small forward and power forward positions for the Charlotte 49ers. In his senior year he captained the team and led the Sun Belt Conference in rebounds.

== Professional basketball career ==
Smith went on to play on various professional basketball teams including: the Hemel & Watford Royals of the Premier English Basketball League (1985–86), TuS Bramsche in the German Basketball League (1986–87) the Westchester Golden Apples of the United States Basketball League (summer of 1986), AST Tarrare in France (1987–88) and Kumagai Gumi Bruins of the Japan Basketball League (1988–90). In many instances, he led his team in scoring, rebounding and blocked shots.

== Business career ==
After retiring from basketball, Smith worked for ASICS AMERICA before establishing himself in media, entertainment and the tech space.

He is currently the Co-founder and President of a tech start-up and the President of a Hollywood film company. He also served as Vice President of sales and marketing for the TV Distribution group at NBC Universal and was recognized as one of the most influential black men in cable. Smith was also the CEO of entertainment media consulting company HLS Entertainment.

== Personal life ==
Smith is married with three children and resides in Rancho Cucamonga, California.

Smith is on the advisory board for the Scholastic Basketball Academy, a non-profit basketball program dedicated to the educational and athletic development of youth.
