= Naho Miyoshi =

Japanese basketball player (born 1993)

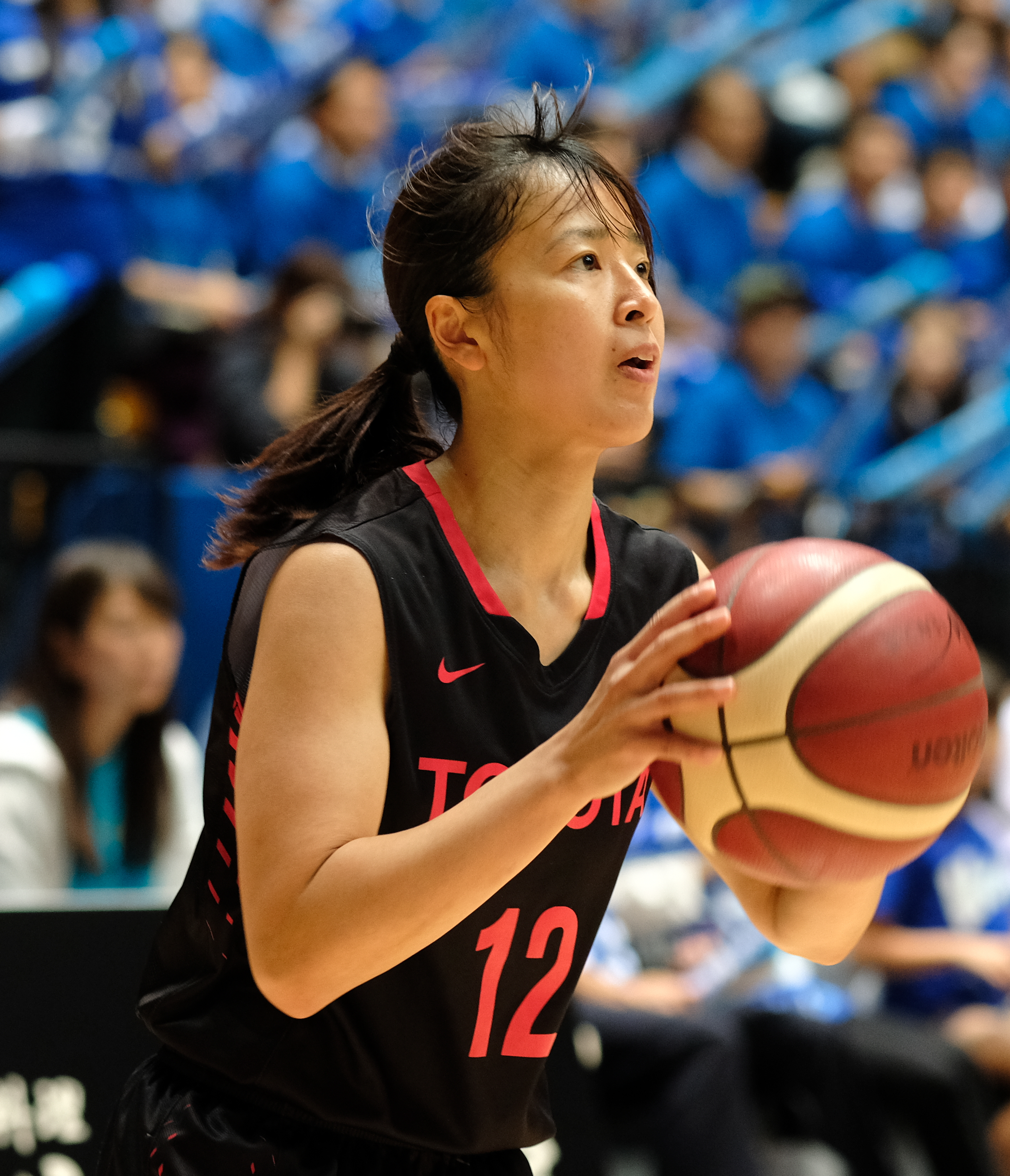
- Miyoshi with the Toyota Antelopes in 2019

Personal information
- Born: December 21, 1993 (age 32) Ichikawa, Chiba
- Listed height: 5 ft 5 in (1.65 m)
- Listed weight: 141 lb (64 kg)

Career information
- High school: Oka Gakuen (Shōwa-ku, Nagoya)
- Playing career: 2012–2022
- Position: Guard

Career history
- 2012–2017: Chanson V-Magic
- 2017–2022: Toyota Antelopes
Medals
Women's basketball
Representing Japan
Olympic Games
Silver medal – second place	2020 Tokyo	Team
FIBA 3x3 Under-18 World Cup
Bronze medal – third place	2011 Rimini	Japan 3x3 U18
Asian Games
Bronze medal – third place	2014 Incheon	Team
FIBA 3x3 Women's Series
Silver medal – second place	2019 Chengdu	Japan 3x3
Silver medal – second place	2019 Montreal	Japan 3x3

Naho Miyoshi (三好 南穂, Miyoshi Naho; born December 21, 1993) is a Japanese former professional basketball player. Miyoshi played 10 seasons in the Women's Japan Basketball League (WJBL) for the Chanson V-Magic and Toyota Antelopes. She represented Japan in the women's tournament at the 2016 Summer Olympics, and at the 2020 Summer Olympics, winning a silver medal.
