= Kaede Kondo =

Japanese basketball player

Personal information
- Born: October 6, 1991 (age 35)
- Listed height: 5 ft 8 in (1.73 m)
- Position: Small forward

Kaede Kondo (近藤 楓, Kondō Kaede; born October 6, 1991) is a Japanese basketball player. Kondo attended Ehime Prefecture Niihama Commercial Hugh School, a school well known for the strength of its basketball team. In her third year of high school, Kondo represented Ehime Prefecture in the national high school basketball tournament. For university, Kondo attended Osaka University of Human Sciences. In 2016, following her Olympic appearance, Kondo was awarded Shikoku Chuo City citizen of the year.

== Professional career ==
Kondo began her professional career in the Women's Japan Basketball League (W-League) competition in 2014, and finished her career in 2022, announcing her retirement in April 2022 after an injury in March. She played for the Toyota Antelopes from 2014-2019, and for Denso Iris from 2019-2022.

== International games ==
Kondo represented Japan in the basketball competition at the 2016 Summer Olympics. She was also a member of the Japanese team which won the gold medal at the 2017 Fiba Women’s Asia Cup. Her final international appearance for Japan was in the FIBA Women's Basketball World Cup 2022 Qualifying Round in February 2022.

== Post career ==
After retiring from basketball, Kondo started working as a city employee of Shikoku Chuo city from 2023, working for the education department.
