= Toyota Antelopes =

Toyota Antelopes トヨタ自動車アンテロープス
- Leagues: Women's Japan Basketball League
- Founded: 1963
- Location: Nagoya, Aichi
- Head coach: Yuko Oga
- Website: toyotatimes-sports.toyota/teams/antelopes/
Home	Away	Third

The Toyota Antelopes (トヨタ自動車アンテロープス, Toyotajidōsha Anterōpusu) are a Japanese professional basketball team based in Nagoya, Aichi, Japan. The Antelopes compete in the "Premier" first division of the Women's Japan Basketball League (WJBL).

== Notable players ==
- Kaede Kondo
- Emi Kudeken
- Mika Kurihara
- Evelyn Mawuli
- Stephanie Mawuli
- Naho Miyoshi
- Mucha Mori
- Moeko Nagaoka
- Moe Nagata
- Yuko Oga
- Yoshie Sakurada
- Takami Takeuchi
- Mai Yamamoto

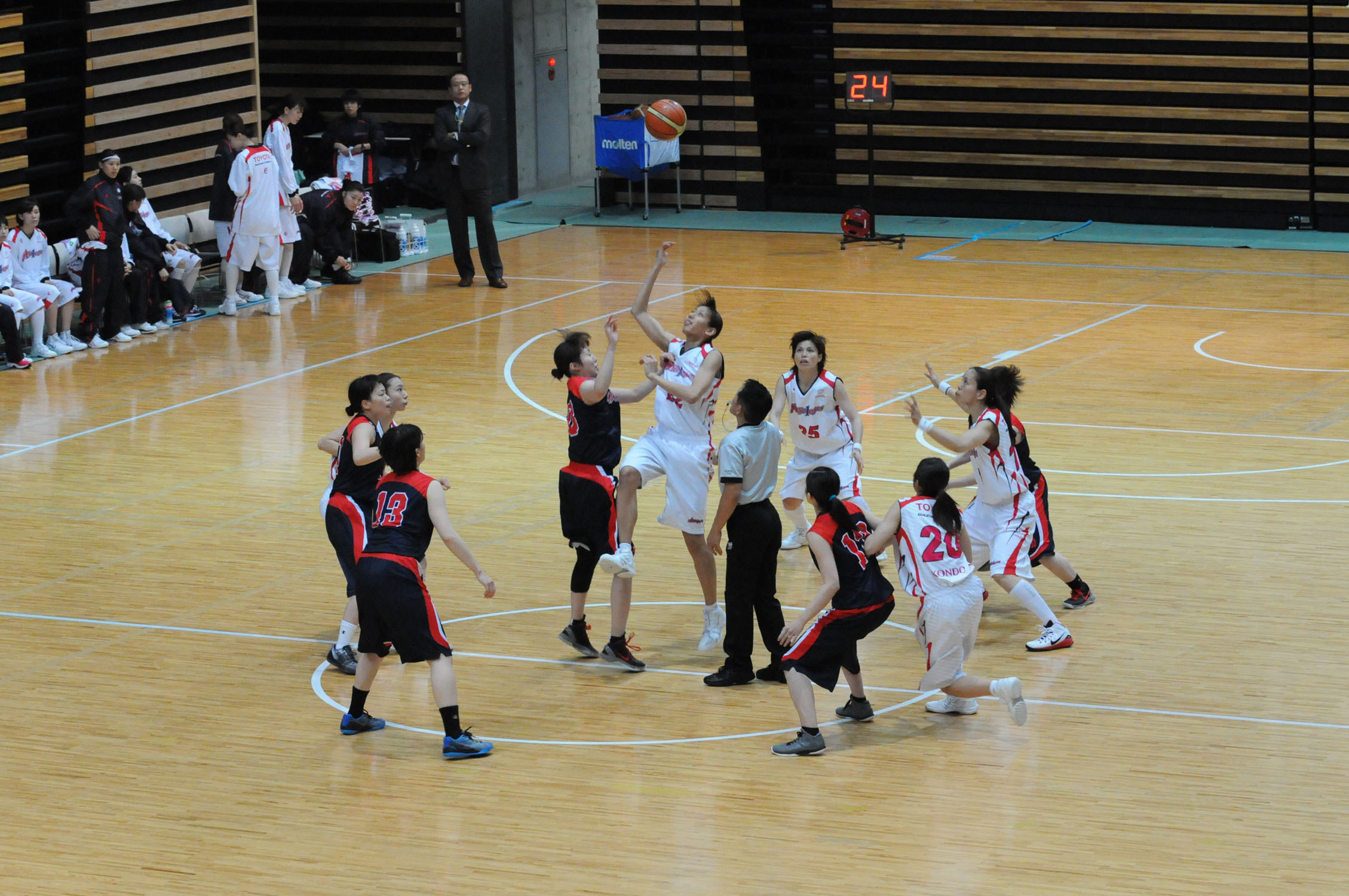

== Coaches ==
- Don Beck (basketball)
- Toshihiro Goto
- Lucas Mondelo
- Yuko Oga
