= Mika Kurihara Fujitaka =

Japanese basketball player (born 1989)

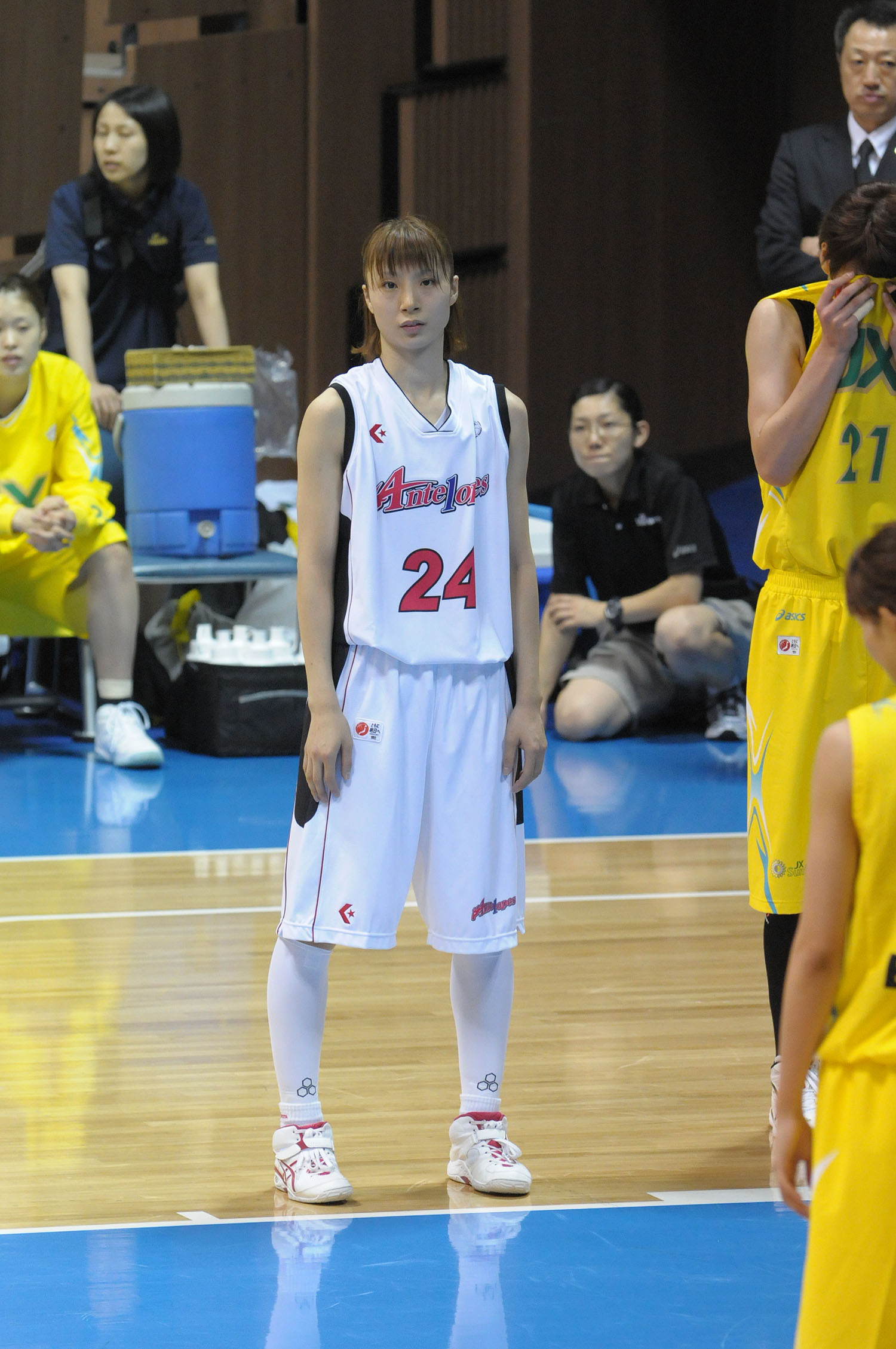

Personal information
- Born: 14 May 1989 (age 37) Osaka, Japan
- Listed height: 5 ft 9 in (1.75 m)
- Listed weight: 150 lb (68 kg)
- Position: Shooting guard
- Number: 24
Medals
Women's basketball
Representing Japan
FIBA Asia Cup
| Gold medal – first place | 2015 Wuhan | Japan |

Mika Kurihara Fujitaka
- Spouse: Soichiro Fujitaka (m. 2017)

Mika Kurihara (栗原 三佳; born 14 May 1989) is a Japanese basketball player. She represented Japan in the basketball competition at the 2016 Summer Olympics.

== Professional career ==
Kurihara started her professional career in 2012, playing for the Toyota Antelopes. She played for the Antelopes until 2021 when the team won their first ever championship title. Kurihara announced her retirement after that win.

== International career ==
Kurihara represented Japan at the 2014 FIBA World Championship for Women, and the 2018 FIBA Women's Basketball World Cup.

Kurihara was a member of the gold medal winning Japanese team at the 2015 FIBA Asia Cup in Wuhan.

Kurihara represented Japan in the basketball competition at the 2016 Summer Olympics. She had the third best three-point scoring percentage in the tournament. This was despite her fracturing and separating a finger in the first match against Belarus.

== Personal ==
Kurihara married Soichiro Fujitaka, a professional basketball player for the Osaka Evessa, in 2017.
