= Sedláček =

Sedláček (feminine: Sedláčková) is a Czech surname. It is a diminutive of Sedlák, which means a 'peasant farmer' or 'freeman farmer' who was relatively wealthy and owned his own land. Since the time of Austria-Hungary, which included Czech lands, the surname is also known under German and Hungarian spellings.

== Spelling variations ==
Language	Masculine	Feminine
Czech, Slovak	Sedláček	Sedláčková
English	Sedlachek	
French	Sedlatchek	
German	Sedlatschek	
Hungarian	Szedlacsek	
Polish	Sedlaczek	
Romanian	Sedlacec	
Serbo-Croatian	Sedlaček	
Other	Sedlatzek	

== People ==
=== Sedláček ===
- August Sedláček (1843–1926), Czech historian
- Hugo Sedláček (1895–1952), Czech water polo player
- Jakub Sedláček (disambiguation), multiple individuals
- Ján Sedláček (born 1968), Slovak handballer
- Josef Sedláček (1893–1985), Czech footballer
- Kamil Sedláček (1926–2011), Czech linguist
- Karel Sedláček (born 1979), Czech darts player
- Lumír Sedláček (born 1978), Czech footballer
- Michal Sedláček (born 1988), Czech footballer
- Milan Sedláček (1961–2012), Czech mountaineer
- Pavel Sedláček (disambiguation), multiple individuals
- Richard Sedláček (born 1999), Czech footballer
- Roman Sedláček (born 1963), Czech footballer
- Tomáš Sedláček (disambiguation), multiple individuals
- Vojtěch Sedláček (born 1947), Czech entrepreneur

=== Sedláčková ===
- Andrea Sedláčková (born 1967), Czech film director and screenwriter
- Jana Sedláčková (born 1993), Czech footballer
- Jaroslava Sedláčková (born 1946), Czech gymnast
- Marta Sedláčková (1934–2023), Czech chess player
- Miroslava Sedláčková (born 1977), Czech Paralympic athlete
- Nikola Sedláčková (born 1990), Czech footballer

=== Sedlaček ===
- Marin Sedlaček (born 1959), Serbian basketball coach
- Marko Sedlaček (born 1996), Croatian volleyball player

=== Sedlacek ===
- Franz Sedlacek (1891–1945), Austrian painter
- Norbert Sedlacek (born 1962), Austrian sailor
- Robert Sedlacek (1881–1957), Austrian artist
- Shawn Sedlacek (born 1977), American baseball player
- Tim Sedlacek (born 1961), American soccer player
- Woodrow Sedlacek (1919–2004), American racing horse trainer

=== Sedlaczek, Sedlatzek, Szedlacsek ===
- Robert Sedlaczek (born 1952), Austrian journalist
- Stanisław Sedlaczek (1892–1941), Polish WWII resistance member
- Johann Sedlatzek or Sedlaczek (1789–1866), Silesian flautist
- Ferenc Szedlacsek (1898–1973), Czech-Hungarian footballer
- István Szedlacsek (born 1966), Hungarian footballer
