= 2014 FIBA World Championship for Women squads =

Basketball tournament squads

The following is the list of squads for each of the 16 teams competing in the 2014 FIBA World Championship for Women, held in Turkey between September 27 and October 5. Each team selected a squad of 12 players for the tournament.

== Group A ==
=== Brazil ===
A 14-player roster was named on 25 July 2014. On 15 September 2014, a 13-player squad was published. The final roster was announced on 17 September 2014.

Brazil women's national basketball team - 2014 FIBA World Championship for Women roster
Players
Coaches

Pos.	No.	Name	Age – Date of birth	Height	Club
G	4	Adriana Moisés Pinto	35 – 6 December 1978	1.65 m (5 ft 5 in)	América Basquete	(Brazil)
G	5	Débora Costa	23 – 12 August 1991	1.64 m (5 ft 5 in)	São José	(Brazil)
F	6	Joice Coelho	21 – 1 April 1993	1.80 m (5 ft 11 in)	São José	(Brazil)
G	7	Patrícia Teixeira	23 – 28 September 1990	1.78 m (5 ft 10 in)	São José	(Brazil)
G	8	Tainá Paixão	22 – 29 November 1991	1.73 m (5 ft 8 in)	América Basquete	(Brazil)
G	9	Jaqueline de Paula	28 – 17 February 1986	1.79 m (5 ft 10 in)	Santo André	(Brazil)
F	10	Tatiane Pacheco	23 – 16 October 1990	1.81 m (5 ft 11 in)	América Basquete	(Brazil)
F	11	Clarissa dos Santos	26 – 10 March 1988	1.84 m (6 ft 0 in)	ADCF Unimed	(Brazil)
F	12	Damiris Dantas	21 – 17 November 1992	1.93 m (6 ft 4 in)	Minnesota Lynx	(United States)
C	13	Nádia Colhado	25 – 25 February 1989	1.93 m (6 ft 4 in)	Atlanta Dream	(United States)
C	14	Érika de Souza	32 – 9 March 1982	1.96 m (6 ft 5 in)	Atlanta Dream	(United States)
F	15	Isabela Ramona	20 – 23 January 1994	1.79 m (5 ft 10 in)	São José	(Brazil)

Head coach

- Luiz Augusto Zanon

Assistant coach(es)

- Cristiano Cedra

Legend

- Club – describes last
  club before the tournament
- Age – describes age
  on 27 September 2014

=== Czech Republic ===
The roster was announced on 12 September 2014.

Czech Republic women's national basketball team - 2014 FIBA World Championship for Women roster
Players
Coaches

Pos.	No.	Name	Age – Date of birth	Height	Club
F	4	Jana Veselá	30 – 31 December 1983	1.94 m (6 ft 4 in)	ZVVZ USK Prague	(Czech Republic)
F	5	Michaela Stejskalová	27 – 4 April 1987	1.86 m (6 ft 1 in)	ZVVZ USK Praha	(Czech Republic)
G	6	Romana Hejdová	26 – 9 May 1988	1.84 m (6 ft 0 in)	Angers BC	(France)
F	7	Alena Hanušová	23 – 29 May 1991	1.90 m (6 ft 3 in)	ZVVZ USK Prague	(Czech Republic)
C	8	Ilona Burgrová	30 – 15 March 1984	1.96 m (6 ft 5 in)	ZVVZ USK Prague	(Czech Republic)
G	9	Kateřina Bartoňová	24 – 17 January 1990	1.73 m (5 ft 8 in)	Piešťanské Čajky	(Slovakia)
F	10	Tereza Vyoralová	20 – 16 January 1994	1.78 m (5 ft 10 in)	VŠ Prague	(Czech Republic)
G	11	Kateřina Elhotová	24 – 14 October 1989	1.81 m (5 ft 11 in)	ZVVZ USK Prague	(Czech Republic)
G	12	Kateřina Sedláková	24 – 28 April 1990	1.76 m (5 ft 9 in)	Valosun KP Brno	(Czech Republic)
C	13	Petra Kulichová	30 – 13 September 1984	1.98 m (6 ft 6 in)	Beşiktaş	(Turkey)
F	14	Tereza Pecková	27 – 10 July 1987	1.89 m (6 ft 2 in)	BK Brno	(Czech Republic)
F	15	Eva Vítečková	32 – 16 January 1982	1.90 m (6 ft 3 in)	ZVVZ USK Prague	(Czech Republic)

Head coach

- Lubor Blažek

Assistant coach(es)

- Ivan Beneš
- Aleš Kaplan

Legend

- Club – describes last
  club before the tournament
- Age – describes age
  on 27 September 2014

=== Japan ===
The roster was announced on 15 August 2014.

Japan women's national basketball team - 2014 FIBA World Championship for Women roster
Players
Coaches

Pos.	No.	Name	Age – Date of birth	Height	Club
G	4	Kumiko Oba	26 – 17 May 1988	1.69 m (5 ft 7 in)	Denso Iris	(Japan)
F	5	Maki Takada	25 – 23 August 1989	1.83 m (6 ft 0 in)	Denso Iris	(Japan)
C	6	Yuka Mamiya	24 – 3 April 1990	1.84 m (6 ft 0 in)	JX Sunflowers	(Japan)
G	7	Chinatsu Yamamoto	23 – 12 August 1991	1.76 m (5 ft 9 in)	Fujitsu Redwave	(Japan)
G	8	Michiko Miyamoto	28 – 9 April 1986	1.75 m (5 ft 9 in)	Mitsubishi Koalas	(Japan)
G	9	Emi Kudeken	30 – 3 August 1984	1.65 m (5 ft 5 in)	Toyota Antelopes	(Japan)
F	10	Ramu Tokashiki	23 – 11 June 1991	1.92 m (6 ft 4 in)	JX Sunflowers	(Japan)
G	11	Mika Kurihara	25 – 14 May 1989	1.76 m (5 ft 9 in)	Toyota Antelopes	(Japan)
F	12	Moeko Nagaoka	20 – 29 December 1993	1.82 m (6 ft 0 in)	Fujitsu Redwave	(Japan)
G	13	Yuko Oga	31 – 17 October 1982	1.70 m (5 ft 7 in)	Shanxi Flame	(China)
F	14	Yuki Miyazawa	21 – 2 June 1993	1.82 m (6 ft 0 in)	JX Sunflowers	(Japan)
C	15	Asako O	26 – 16 December 1987	1.89 m (6 ft 2 in)	Mitsubishi Koalas	(Japan)

Head coach

- Tomohide Utsumi

Assistant coach(es)

- Eiki Umezaki

Legend

- Club – describes last
  club before the tournament
- Age – describes age
  on 27 September 2014

=== Spain ===
A 13-player squad was named on 9 September 2014 and the final roster was announced on 22 September 2014.

Spain women's national basketball team - 2014 FIBA World Championship for Women roster
Players
Coaches

Pos.	No.	Name	Age – Date of birth	Height	Club
F	4	Laura Nicholls	25 – 26 February 1989	1.90 m (6 ft 3 in)	Rivas Ecópolis	(Spain)
G	5	Leticia Romero	19 – 28 May 1995	1.74 m (5 ft 9 in)	Florida State Seminoles	(United States)
G	6	Sílvia Domínguez	27 – 31 January 1987	1.67 m (5 ft 6 in)	UMMC Ekaterinburg	(Russia)
F	7	Alba Torrens	25 – 30 August 1989	1.91 m (6 ft 3 in)	Galatasaray S.K.	(Turkey)
G	8	Leonor Rodríguez	22 – 21 October 1991	1.80 m (5 ft 11 in)	CB Avenida	(Spain)
G	9	Laia Palau	35 – 10 September 1979	1.81 m (5 ft 11 in)	ZVVZ UŠK Prague	(Czech Republic)
G	10	Marta Xargay	23 – 20 December 1990	1.80 m (5 ft 11 in)	CB Avenida	(Spain)
F	11	Nuria Martínez	30 – 29 February 1984	1.75 m (5 ft 9 in)	Kayseri Kaski	(Turkey)
F	12	Laura Gil	22 – 24 April 1992	1.91 m (6 ft 3 in)	Rivas Ecópolis	(Spain)
C	13	Lucila Pascua	31 – 21 March 1983	1.96 m (6 ft 5 in)	PINKK-Pécsi 424	(Hungary)
F	14	Sancho Lyttle	31 – 20 September 1983	1.93 m (6 ft 4 in)	Galatasaray	(Turkey)
G	15	Anna Cruz	27 – 27 October 1986	1.79 m (5 ft 10 in)	Nadezhda Orenburg	(Russia)

Head coach

- Lucas Mondelo

Assistant coach(es)

- Víctor Lapeña
- Isabel Sánchez

Legend

- Club – describes last
  club before the tournament
- Age – describes age
  on 27 September 2014

== Group B ==
=== Canada ===
The roster was announced on 15 September 2014.

Canada women's national basketball team - 2014 FIBA World Championship for Women roster
Players
Coaches

Pos.	No.	Name	Age – Date of birth	Height	Club
G	4	Miah-Marie Langolis	23 – 21 September 1991	1.70 m (5 ft 7 in)	LF Basket Norrbotten	(Sweden)
G	5	Kia Nurse	18 – 22 February 1996	1.77 m (5 ft 10 in)	Connecticut Huskies	(United States)
G	6	Shona Thorburn	32 – 7 August 1982	1.75 m (5 ft 9 in)	Toulouse Basket	(France)
G	7	Courtnay Pilypaitis	26 – 11 February 1988	1.82 m (6 ft 0 in)	VIČI-Aistės	(Lithuania)
G	8	Kim Gaucher	30 – 7 May 1984	1.80 m (5 ft 11 in)	ASPTT Arras	(France)
F	9	Miranda Ayim	26 – 6 May 1988	1.87 m (6 ft 2 in)	Toulouse Basket	(France)
G	10	Nirra Fields	20 – 3 December 1993	1.70 m (5 ft 7 in)	UCLA Bruins	(United States)
F	11	Katherine Plouffe	22 – 15 September 1992	1.90 m (6 ft 3 in)	BC ICIM Arad	(Romania)
F	12	Lizanne Murphy	30 – 15 March 1984	1.82 m (6 ft 0 in)	Angers BC 49	(France)
F	13	Tamara Tatham	29 – 19 August 1985	1.82 m (6 ft 0 in)	Piešťanské Čajky	(Slovakia)
C	14	Krysten Boogaard	26 – 18 February 1988	1.95 m (6 ft 5 in)	UNI Győr	(Hungary)
F	15	Michelle Plouffe	22 – 15 September 1992	1.90 m (6 ft 3 in)	ASPTT Arras	(France)

Head coach

- Lisa Thomaidis

Assistant coach(es)

- Steve Baur
- Shawnee Harle
- Bev Smith

Legend

- Club – describes last
  club before the tournament
- Age – describes age
  on 27 September 2014

=== France ===
The roster was announced on 10 September 2014.

France women's national basketball team - 2014 FIBA World Championship for Women roster
Players
Coaches

Pos.	No.	Name	Age – Date of birth	Height	Club
G	4	Anaël Lardy	26 – 24 October 1987	1.70 m (5 ft 7 in)	ASPTT Arras	(France)
C	5	Endéné Miyem	26 – 15 May 1988	1.88 m (6 ft 2 in)	Bourges Basket	(France)
F	6	Diandra Tchatchouang	23 – 14 June 1991	1.89 m (6 ft 2 in)	Bourges Basket	(France)
C	7	Sandrine Gruda	27 – 25 June 1987	1.93 m (6 ft 4 in)	UMMC Ekaterinburg	(Russia)
G	8	Ingrid Tanqueray	26 – 25 August 1988	1.66 m (5 ft 5 in)	Basket Lattes	(France)
G	9	Céline Dumerc	32 – 9 July 1982	1.69 m (5 ft 7 in)	Bourges Basket	(France)
C	10	Ana Căta-Chițiga	25 – 20 June 1989	1.95 m (6 ft 5 in)	Charleville	(France)
G	11	Émilie Gomis	30 – 18 October 1983	1.80 m (5 ft 11 in)	Hainaut Basket	(France)
C	12	Marielle Amant	24 – 9 December 1989	1.90 m (6 ft 3 in)	Nantes Basket	(France)
G	13	Gaëlle Skrela	31 – 24 January 1983	1.77 m (5 ft 10 in)	Basket Lattes	(France)
G	14	Paoline Salagnac	30 – 13 March 1984	1.76 m (5 ft 9 in)	Bourges Basket	(France)
C	15	Héléna Ciak	24 – 15 December 1989	1.97 m (6 ft 6 in)	Basket Lattes	(France)

Head coach

- Valérie Garnier

Assistant coach(es)

- Grégory Halin
- Olivier Lafargue

Legend

- Club – describes last
  club before the tournament
- Age – describes age
  on 27 September 2014

=== Mozambique ===
A 19-player preliminary roster was announced on 3 July 2014 which was trimmed to 14 on 24 July 2014.

Mozambique women's national basketball team - 2014 FIBA World Championship for Women roster
Players
Coaches

Pos.	No.	Name	Age – Date of birth	Height	Club
G	4	Valerdina Manhonga	33 – 26 December 1980	1.68 m (5 ft 6 in)	Ligua Maputo	(Mozambique)
G	5	Deolinda Ngulela	33 – 18 April 1981	1.70 m (5 ft 7 in)	Ligua Maputo	(Mozambique)
F	6	Ana Flávia Azinheira	37 – 8 February 1977	1.84 m (6 ft 0 in)	Clube Politécnica	(Mozambique)
G	7	Anabela Cossa	28 – 7 April 1986	1.72 m (5 ft 8 in)	Ligua Maputo	(Mozambique)
C	8	Ilda Chambe	27 – 19 April 1987	1.83 m (6 ft 0 in)	Clube Politécnica	(Mozambique)
F	9	Catia Halar	31 – 28 November 1982	1.73 m (5 ft 8 in)	Ligua Maputo	(Mozambique)
G	10	Filomena Micato	28 – 26 January 1986	1.68 m (5 ft 6 in)	Ligua Maputo	(Mozambique)
C	11	Leia Dongue	23 – 24 May 1991	1.84 m (6 ft 0 in)	Primeiro Agosto	(Angola)
F	12	Rute Muianga	31 – 6 April 1983	1.77 m (5 ft 10 in)	Ferroviário Maputo	(Mozambique)
F	13	Regina Mahoche	24 – 6 June 1990	1.82 m (6 ft 0 in)	Ferroviário Maputo	(Mozambique)
F	14	Odélia Mafanela	25 – 14 April 1989	1.82 m (6 ft 0 in)	Ligua Maputo	(Mozambique)
C	15	Deolinda Gimo	27 – 15 August 1987	1.88 m (6 ft 2 in)	Ferroviário Maputo	(Mozambique)

Head coach

- Nasir Salé

Assistant coach(es)

- Dilar Dessai
- Bernardo Matsimbe

Legend

- Club – describes last
  club before the tournament
- Age – describes age
  on 27 September 2014

=== Turkey ===
A 17-player preliminary roster was announced on 28 May 2014 which was trimmed to 13 on 7 September 2014. The final roster was announced on 17 September 2014.

Turkey women's national basketball team - 2014 FIBA World Championship for Women roster
Players
Coaches

Pos.	No.	Name	Age – Date of birth	Height	Club
F	4	Tuğba Palazoğlu	33 – 4 December 1980	1.70 m (5 ft 7 in)	Fenerbahçe	(Turkey)
F	5	Tuğçe Canıtez	23 – 10 November 1990	1.90 m (6 ft 3 in)	Fenerbahçe	(Turkey)
F	6	Cansu Köksal	20 – 28 April 1994	1.87 m (6 ft 2 in)	Fenerbahçe	(Turkey)
G	7	Birsel Vardarlı	30 – 12 July 1984	1.74 m (5 ft 9 in)	Fenerbahçe	(Turkey)
F	8	Yasemin Begüm Dalgalar	26 – 8 June 1988	1.85 m (6 ft 1 in)	Beşiktaş	(Turkey)
G	9	Esmeral Tunçluer	34 – 7 June 1980	1.75 m (5 ft 9 in)	Fenerbahçe	(Turkey)
G	10	Işıl Alben	28 – 22 February 1986	1.70 m (5 ft 7 in)	Dynamo Kursk	(Russia)
C	11	Nevriye Yılmaz	34 – 16 June 1980	1.93 m (6 ft 4 in)	Galatasaray	(Turkey)
F	12	LaToya Pringle	27 – 11 September 1986	1.91 m (6 ft 3 in)	Kayseri Kaski	(Turkey)
C	13	Tilbe Şenyürek	19 – 26 April 1995	1.87 m (6 ft 2 in)	Botaş SK	(Turkey)
F	14	Şaziye İvegin	32 – 8 February 1982	1.83 m (6 ft 0 in)	İstanbul Üniv	(Turkey)
F	15	Bahar Çağlar	25 – 28 September 1988	1.90 m (6 ft 3 in)	Galatasaray	(Turkey)

Head coach

- Ceyhun Yıldızoğlu

Assistant coach(es)

- Ömer Buharalı
- Erman Okerman
- Erkan Metin

Legend

- Club – describes last
  club before the tournament
- Age – describes age
  on 27 September 2014

== Group C ==
=== Australia ===
The squad was announced on 10 September 2014. Liz Cambage was ruled out due to a ruptured Achilles tendon on 21 September 2014.

Australia women's national basketball team - 2014 FIBA World Championship for Women roster
Players
Coaches

Pos.	No.	Name	Age – Date of birth	Height	Club
G	4	Tessa Lavey	21 – 29 March 1993	1.71 m (5 ft 7 in)	Bendigo Spirit	(Australia)
G	5	Leilani Mitchell	29 – 15 June 1985	1.65 m (5 ft 5 in)	Sydney Uni Flames	(Australia)
G	6	Rebecca Allen	21 – 6 November 1992	1.86 m (6 ft 1 in)	Melbourne Boomers	(Australia)
G	7	Penny Taylor	33 – 24 May 1981	1.85 m (6 ft 1 in)	Phoenix Mercury	(United States)
F	8	Gabrielle Richards	29 – 19 November 1984	1.88 m (6 ft 2 in)	Bendigo Spirit	(Australia)
F	9	Natalie Burton	25 – 23 March 1989	1.94 m (6 ft 4 in)	Melbourne Boomers	(Australia)
F	10	Rachel Jarry	22 – 6 December 1991	1.86 m (6 ft 1 in)	Melbourne Boomers	(Australia)
F	11	Laura Hodges	30 – 13 December 1983	1.90 m (6 ft 3 in)	Adelaide Lightning	(Australia)
G	12	Belinda Snell	33 – 10 January 1981	1.82 m (6 ft 0 in)	Bendigo Spirit	(Australia)
G	13	Erin Phillips	29 – 19 May 1985	1.73 m (5 ft 8 in)	Phoenix Mercury	(United States)
C	14	Marianna Tolo	25 – 2 July 1989	1.96 m (6 ft 5 in)	CJM Basket	(France)
F	15	Cayla Francis	25 – 1 May 1989	1.94 m (6 ft 4 in)	Townsville Fire	(Australia)

Head coach

- Brendan Joyce

Assistant coach(es)

- Lori Chizik
- Damian Cotter

Legend

- Club – describes last
  club before the tournament
- Age – describes age
  on 27 September 2014

=== Belarus ===
A 19-player preliminary roster was announced on 5 July 2014.

Belarus women's national basketball team - 2014 FIBA World Championship for Women roster
Players
Coaches

Pos.	No.	Name	Age – Date of birth	Height	Club
G	4	Nadzeya Drozd	31 – 8 March 1983	1.68 m (5 ft 6 in)	Olimpia Grodno	(Belarus)
G	5	Aliaksandra Tarasava	26 – 23 June 1988	1.70 m (5 ft 7 in)	TSV Wasserburg	(Germany)
F	6	Katsiaryna Snytsina	29 – 2 September 1985	1.88 m (6 ft 2 in)	Basket Lattes	(France)
G	7	Volha Ziuzkova	31 – 14 June 1983	1.71 m (5 ft 7 in)	Tsmoki-Minsk	(Belarus)
G	8	Tatsiana Likhtarovich	26 – 29 March 1988	1.80 m (5 ft 11 in)	Tarbes GB	(France)
G	9	Natallia Anufryienka	29 – 11 June 1985	1.75 m (5 ft 9 in)	Horizont Minsk	(Belarus)
F	10	Maryia Papova	20 – 13 July 1994	1.89 m (6 ft 2 in)	Tsmoki-Minsk	(Belarus)
C	11	Yelena Leuchanka	31 – 30 April 1983	1.95 m (6 ft 5 in)	Jiangsu Phoenix	(China)
G	12	Ksenija Voishal	19 – 18 October 1994	1.80 m (5 ft 11 in)	Olimpia Grodno	(Belarus)
F	13	Tatyana Troina	33 – 30 June 1981	1.88 m (6 ft 2 in)	Horizont Minsk	(Belarus)
F	14	Nataliya Trafimava	35 – 16 June 1979	1.84 m (6 ft 0 in)	Horizont Minsk	(Belarus)
F	15	Olga Vashkevich	25 – 27 October 1988	1.89 m (6 ft 2 in)	Tsmoki-Minsk	(Belarus)

Head coach

- Rimantas Grigas

Assistant coach(es)

- Siarhei Svetnik

Legend

- Club – describes last
  club before the tournament where known
- Age – describes age
  on 27 September 2014

=== Cuba ===
Cuba women's national basketball team - 2014 FIBA World Championship for Women roster
Players
Coaches

Pos.	No.	Name	Age – Date of birth	Height	Club
F	4	Fransy Ochoa	24 – 13 September 1990	1.80 m (5 ft 11 in)	Villa Clara	(Cuba)
G	5	Ineidis Casanova	25 – 13 October 1988	1.70 m (5 ft 7 in)	Santiago de Cuba	(Cuba)
G	6	Anisleidy Galindo	25 – 21 September 1989	1.80 m (5 ft 11 in)	Pinar del Río	(Cuba)
G	7	Oyanaisis Gelis	30 – 21 October 1983	1.75 m (5 ft 9 in)	Santiago de Cuba	(Cuba)
G	8	Arlenys Romero	30 – 7 February 1984	1.76 m (5 ft 9 in)	Pinar del Río	(Cuba)
G	9	Yamara Amargo	29 – 28 June 1985	1.78 m (5 ft 10 in)	Sancti Spíritus	(Cuba)
F	10	Arlety Povea	29 – 7 October 1984	1.82 m (6 ft 0 in)	Pinar del Río	(Cuba)
C	11	Marlen Cepeda	28 – 27 October 1985	1.85 m (6 ft 1 in)	Sancti Spíritus	(Cuba)
C	12	Clenia Noblet	27 – 6 May 1987	1.81 m (5 ft 11 in)	Guantánamo	(Cuba)
F	13	Tamiy Fernández	32 – 29 July 1982	1.82 m (6 ft 0 in)	Pinar del Río	(Cuba)
G	14	Leidys Oquendo	32 – 23 July 1982	1.78 m (5 ft 10 in)	Camagüey	(Cuba)
F	15	Suchitel Ávila	32 – 1 September 1982	1.80 m (5 ft 11 in)	Capitalinas	(Cuba)

Head coach

- Alberto Zabala

Assistant coach(es)

- Eduardo Moya

Legend

- Club – describes last
  club before the tournament
- Age – describes age
  on 27 September 2014

=== Korea ===
The squad was announced on 21 July 2014. A final roster change was made on 19 September 2014.

Korea women's national basketball team - 2014 FIBA World Championship for Women roster
Players
Coaches

Pos.	No.	Name	Age – Date of birth	Height	Club
F	4	Kim Si-on	19 – May 29, 1995	1.77 m (5 ft 10 in)	KDB Life	(South Korea)
F	5	Kim Youn-joo	28 – April 18, 1986	1.78 m (5 ft 10 in)	Shinhan Bank	(South Korea)
G	6	Hong A-ran	22 – April 2, 1992	1.74 m (5 ft 9 in)	KB	(South Korea)
F	7	Hong Bo-ram	25 – October 1, 1988	1.78 m (5 ft 10 in)	KEB–Hana Bank	(South Korea)
G	8	Shin Ji-hyun	19 – September 12, 1995	1.74 m (5 ft 9 in)	KEB–Hana Bank	(South Korea)
C	9	Kim So-dam	21 – January 4, 1993	1.85 m (6 ft 1 in)	KDB Life	(South Korea)
F	10	Bae Hye-yoon	25 – June 16, 1989	1.82 m (6 ft 0 in)	Samsung	(South Korea)
F	11	Choi Hee-jin	26 – November 10, 1987	1.80 m (5 ft 11 in)	Samsung	(South Korea)
F	12	Kang Lee-seul	20 – April 5, 1994	1.80 m (5 ft 11 in)	KEB–Hana Bank	(South Korea)
G	13	Lee Seung-ah	22 – May 25, 1992	1.75 m (5 ft 9 in)	Woori Bank	(South Korea)
C	14	Kim Soo-yeon	28 – April 17, 1986	1.83 m (6 ft 0 in)	KB	(South Korea)
C	15	Park Ji-su	15 – December 6, 1998	1.95 m (6 ft 5 in)	Bundang Mgt. High School	(South Korea)

Head coach

- Kim Young-joo

Assistant coach(es)

- Lee Jee-seung

Legend

- Club – describes last
  club before the tournament
- Age – describes age
  on 27 September 2014

== Group D ==
=== Angola ===
A 20-player roster was named on 11 July 2014 and the final squad was announced on 19 September 2014.

Angola women's national basketball team - 2014 FIBA World Championship for Women roster
Players
Coaches

Pos.	No.	Name	Age – Date of birth	Height	Club
G	4	Fineza Eusébio	24 – 18 July 1990	1.68 m (5 ft 6 in)	Primeiro Agosto	(Angola)
G	5	Elsa Eduardo	25 – 23 July 1989	1.70 m (5 ft 7 in)	Interclube	(Angola)
G	6	Rosa Gala	19 – 17 April 1995	1.73 m (5 ft 8 in)	Interclube	(Angola)
F	7	Helena Viegas	19 – 27 April 1995	1.73 m (5 ft 8 in)	Lusíada	(Angola)
F	8	Ana Gonçalves	21 – 3 January 1993	1.82 m (6 ft 0 in)	Primeiro Agosto	(Angola)
F	9	Artemis Afonso	21 – 6 January 1993	1.79 m (5 ft 10 in)	Olivais Coimbra	(Portugal)
F	10	Sónia Guadalupe	29 – 15 September 1985	1.88 m (6 ft 2 in)	Primeiro Agosto	(Angola)
C	11	Luísa Tomás	31 – 24 March 1983	1.92 m (6 ft 4 in)	Primeiro Agosto	(Angola)
F	12	Angelina Golome	26 – 23 March 1988	1.90 m (6 ft 3 in)	Interclube	(Angola)
F	13	Nacissela Maurício	34 – 2 June 1980	1.86 m (6 ft 1 in)	Primeiro Agosto	(Angola)
F	14	Nadir Manuel	27 – 30 November 1986	1.88 m (6 ft 2 in)	Interclube	(Angola)
G	15	Ngiendula Filipe	32 – 20 May 1982	1.80 m (5 ft 11 in)	Interclube	(Angola)

Head coach

- Aníbal Moreira

Assistant coach(es)

- Elisa Pires
- Pedro Santos

Legend

- Club – describes last
  club before the tournament
- Age – describes age
  on 27 September 2014

=== China ===
The squad was announced on 20 September 2014.

Chinese women's national basketball team – 2014 FIBA World Championship for Women roster
Players
Coaches

Pos.	No.	Name	Age – Date of birth	Height	Club
G	4	Yang Liwei	19 – 2 January 1995	1.75 m (5 ft 9 in)	Guangdong Dolphins	(China)
G	5	Chen Xiaojia	26 – 2 April 1988	1.80 m (5 ft 11 in)	Jiangsu Phoenix	(China)
G	6	Li Meng	19 – 2 January 1995	1.80 m (5 ft 11 in)	Shenyang Lions	(China)
F	7	Shao Ting	24 – 10 December 1989	1.84 m (6 ft 0 in)	Beijing Wall	(China)
F	8	Huang Jing	28 – 24 November 1985	1.88 m (6 ft 2 in)	Shanghai Swordfish	(China)
F	9	Ji Yanyan	29 – 29 May 1985	1.83 m (6 ft 0 in)	Heilongjiang Dragons	(China)
F	10	Lu Wen (C)	24 – 26 February 1990	1.90 m (6 ft 3 in)	Bayi Kylin	(China)
F	11	Cheng Feng	24 – 21 April 1990	1.88 m (6 ft 2 in)	Liaoning Hengye	(China)
F	12	Gao Song	22 – 16 April 1992	1.90 m (6 ft 3 in)	Zhejiang Far East	(China)
C	13	Sun Mengran	22 – 16 July 1992	1.95 m (6 ft 5 in)	Bayi Kylin	(China)
C	14	Huang Hongpin	25 – 23 April 1989	1.95 m (6 ft 5 in)	Guangdong Dolphins	(China)
C	15	Zhang Liting	20 – 23 August 1994	1.98 m (6 ft 6 in)	Bayi Kylin	(China)

Head coach

- (Australia) Tom Maher

Assistant coach(es)

- (Australia) Michele Timms
- (China) Xu Limin

Team manager

- (China) Xue Yunfei

Legend

- (C) Team captain
- Club – describes last
  club before the tournament
- Age – describes age
  on 27 September 2014

=== Serbia ===
The squad was announced on 24 September 2014.

Serbia women's national basketball team - 2014 FIBA World Championship for Women roster
Players
Coaches

Pos.	No.	Name	Age – Date of birth	Height	Club
G	4	Tamara Radočaj	26 – 23 December 1987	1.70 m (5 ft 7 in)	UNI Győr	(Hungary)
G	5	Sanja Mandić	19 – 14 March 1995	1.80 m (5 ft 11 in)	Radivoj Korać	(Serbia)
F	6	Saša Čađo	24 – 13 July 1989	1.78 m (5 ft 10 in)	Canik Belediye	(Turkey)
C	7	Sara Krnjić	23 – 15 July 1991	1.93 m (6 ft 4 in)	UNIQA Sopron	(Hungary)
G	8	Nevena Jovanović	24 – 30 June 1990	1.79 m (5 ft 10 in)	PEAC-Pécs	(Hungary)
F	9	Jelena Milovanović	25 – 28 April 1989	1.90 m (6 ft 3 in)	Washington Mystics	(United States)
G	10	Dajana Butulija	28 – 23 February 1986	1.75 m (5 ft 9 in)	Uppsala Basket	(Sweden)
C	11	Tijana Ajduković	23 – 3 June 1991	1.97 m (6 ft 6 in)	Spartak Moscow	(Russia)
F	12	Marina Marković	22 – 19 November 1991	1.81 m (5 ft 11 in)	Lyon Basket	(France)
G	13	Milica Dabović (C)	32 – 16 February 1982	1.70 m (5 ft 7 in)	Lyon Basket	(France)
G	14	Ana Dabović	25 – 18 August 1989	1.83 m (6 ft 0 in)	Los Angeles Sparks	(United States)
F	15	Jovana Rad	27 – 8 May 1987	1.87 m (6 ft 2 in)	Flammes Carolo	(France)

Head coach

- Marina Maljković

Assistant coach(es)

- Bojan Janković
- Miloš Pađen
- Dragan Ratković

Legend

- Club – describes last
  club before the tournament
- Age – describes age
  on 27 September 2014

=== United States ===
On 13 January 2014 USA Basketball announced a 33-player pool from which the final 12-woman squad were determined for the 2014 World Championship. The roster was trimmed to 15 on 18 September 2014 before a 13-player list was released on 21 September 2014. On 23 September the final roster was announced.

United States women's national basketball team - 2014 FIBA World Championship for Women roster
Players
Coaches

Pos.	No.	Name	Age – Date of birth	Height	Club
G	4	Lindsay Whalen	32 – May 9, 1982	1.75 m (5 ft 9 in)	Minnesota Lynx	(United States)
G	5	Seimone Augustus	30 – April 30, 1984	1.83 m (6 ft 0 in)	Minnesota Lynx	(United States)
G	6	Sue Bird	33 – October 16, 1980	1.75 m (5 ft 9 in)	Seattle Storm	(United States)
F	7	Maya Moore	25 – June 11, 1989	1.83 m (6 ft 0 in)	Minnesota Lynx	(United States)
G	8	Angel McCoughtry	28 – September 10, 1986	1.85 m (6 ft 1 in)	Atlanta Dream	(United States)
G	9	Odyssey Sims	22 – July 13, 1992	1.72 m (5 ft 8 in)	Tulsa Shock	(United States)
F	10	Breanna Stewart	20 – August 27, 1994	1.93 m (6 ft 4 in)	Connecticut Huskies	(United States)
F	11	Candice Dupree	29 – June 10, 1985	1.88 m (6 ft 2 in)	Phoenix Mercury	(United States)
G	12	Diana Taurasi	32 – June 11, 1982	1.82 m (6 ft 0 in)	Phoenix Mercury	(United States)
F	13	Nneka Ogwumike	22 – March 22, 1992	1.87 m (6 ft 2 in)	Los Angeles Sparks	(United States)
C	14	Tina Charles	25 – December 5, 1988	1.93 m (6 ft 4 in)	New York Liberty	(United States)
C	15	Brittney Griner	23 – October 18, 1990	2.03 m (6 ft 8 in)	Phoenix Mercury	(United States)

Head coach

- Geno Auriemma

Assistant coach(es)

- Doug Bruno
- Cheryl Reeve
- Dawn Staley
- Jennifer Rizzotti

Legend

- Club – describes last
  club before the tournament
- Age – describes age
  on 27 September 2014
