= Tanqueray (surname) =

Tanqueray (or Tanquerey) is an English and French surname of Norman origin. Notable people with the surname include:

- Anne Tanqueray (1691–1733), English silversmith
- Ingrid Tanqueray (born 1988), French basketball player
- Paul Tanqueray (1905–1991), English photographer
- Charles Tanqueray (1810–1868), British distiller who founded the Tanqueray gin

== See also ==
- The Second Mrs Tanqueray
- Tancred
