= Vashkevich =

Vashkevich is a surname. Notable people with the surname include:

- Maksim Vashkevich (born 1999), Belarusian para swimmer
- Olga Vashkevich (born 1988), Belarusian basketball player
