= Sedlák =

Origin
- Languages: West Slavic (Czech, Slovak)
- Meaning: Old Bohemian (Old Czech) for 'farmer who owns his own land' with the Indo-European root sed- 'to sit, stay'
- Region of origin: Czech Republic (Bohemia and Moravia), Slovakia; taken to Poland, Hungary, Austria, Germany

Other names
- Variant form: Sedláček (diminutive form)

Sedlák (feminine: Sedláková) is a Czech surname, which means a 'peasant farmer' or 'freeman farmer' who was relatively wealthy and owned his own land.

== People ==
- Adam Sedlák (born 1991), Czech ice hockey player
- Anthony Sedlak (1983–2012), Canadian chef
- Borek Sedlák (born 1981), Czech ski jumper
- David Sedlak, American environmental engineer
- Gabriela Sedláková (born 1968), Czech athlete
- Jan Sedlák (born 1994), Czech footballer
- Justin Sedlák (born 1955), Slovak basketball player
- Kateřina Sedláková (born 1990), Czech basketball player
- Lukáš Sedlák (born 1993), Czech ice hockey player
- Martin Sedlák (born 2000), Czech footballer
- Miroslav Sedlák (born 1993), Slovak footballer
- Nikola Sedlak (born 1983), Serbian chess grandmaster
- Oldřich Sedlák (1922–1985), Czech ice hockey player
- Pavol Sedlák (born 1979), Slovak footballer
- Pavol Sedlak (volleyball), Slovak volleyball player
- Tomáš Sedlák (born 1983), Slovak footballer
- Vítězslav Sedlák (born 1991), Czech darts player
- Włodzimierz Sedlak (1911–1993), Polish biochemist
- Zdeněk Sedlák (born 1974), Czech ice hockey player
