= Joice Coelho =

Brazilian basketball player (born 1993)

São José Desportivo
- Position: Forward
- League: Brazilian League

Personal information
- Born: April 1, 1993 (age 33) Rio de Janeiro, Brazil
- Listed height: 5 ft 11 in (1.80 m)

Joice dos Santos Coelho (born 1 April 1993) is a Brazilian basketball player for São José Desportivo and the Brazilian national team, where she participated at the 2014 FIBA World Championship.
