= Jakub Sedláček =

Jakub Sedláček may refer to:

- Jakub Sedláček (ice hockey) (born 1990), Czech ice hockey goaltender
- Jakub Sedláček (footballer) (born 1998), Slovak footballer
