= Pavel Sedláček =

Pavel Sedláček may refer to:

- Pavel Sedláček (hammer thrower) (born 1968), Czech Olympic hammer thrower
- Pavel Sedláček (ice hockey) (born 1994), Czech ice hockey player
- Pavel Sedláček (musician) (born 1941), Czech rock and roll singer and guitarist
