= Kamil Sedláček =

Czech Tibetologist and expert

Kamil Sedláček (7 July 1926 – 2011) was a Czech tibetologist and comparative Sino-Tibetan linguist.

== Biography ==
Sedláček was born in Třebíč on 7 July 1926. He took a secondary graduation exam at Dr. A. Bráf's Commercial Academy in Třebíč in 1946. In 1952, he was awarded an MSc degree in financial sciences, English, and Russian at the Commercial College in Prague. Concurrently, he took courses in modern Chinese at the Language Institute, and occasionally at Charles University as well. In 1952–1953, he did his compulsory military service. His intensive studies in present-day Tibetan and, at a later time, in Sino-Tibetan historical and comparative philology were carefully supervised throughout 1953–57 by his long-standing friend, prof. George de Roerich. In 1968, he achieved a CSc. in modern Tibetan philology from the Oriental Institute of the Czech Academy of Sciences in Prague. In October 1974, the Prague Presidium of the Czech Academy of Sciences arranged the defence of his two scientific publications in the Institute of Orientalistics at the Russian Academy of Sciences, as it was then impossible to defend it in Czechoslovakia. Only in this way it was possible to achieve his DrSc. in Sino-Tibetan historical and comparative philology. (However, the official report on the results has not arrived until 2004, claiming both dissertation works were lost during the making of professional judgement in the Department of Languages of that Institute.) Between 1978 and 1991, K. Sedláček worked as a translator of technical documents from or into Czech, Russian, English, German and Mongolian for the Intergeo Mining Company in Prague. In 1981, he visited both the Mongolian Academy of Sciences and the Gandantegchinlen Monastery in Ulaanbaatar, to deliver to them two volumes of his textbook on modern written Tibetan, titled Tibetan Newspaper Reader and encompassing 1,114 pages, described by him for the first time internationally (Leipzig, 1972). From 1991 to 2007, he worked as a sworn interpreter of English, German, Russian, Ukrainian and Romanian at the Regional Court in Brno. Receiving the Josef Dobrovský Memorial Medal of the Czech Academy of Sciences on 23 February 2010 for distinguished achievement in Sino-Tibetan languages represents perhaps the personally most significant recognition of his lifetime in the study of the philological and philosophical sciences.

In 2008 he was able to address the problem of establishing the relationship of the Ket language to Sino-Tibetan languages, spoken among Siberian Kets by a mere few hundred individuals. These people are related to the Na-Dené Indians of Alaska by both blood and language. He died in 2011.

=== Learned societies ===
Kamil Sedláček was a member of the following learned societies:

- Société de Linguistique de Paris, École des Hautes Études à la Sorbonne, Paris, France (1966)
- American Oriental Society, Sterling Memorial Library, New Haven, Connecticut, United States (1966)
- Royal Asiatic Society of Great Britain and Ireland, London, England (1967)

== Works ==
=== Articles ===
- Učebnice dnešní tibetštiny (Lehrbuch der heutigen tibetischen Sprache), Vol..I, II, III, 600 Seiten, SOAS, University of London, 1956, MS No. 119.873
- On Tibetan Transcription of Chinese Characters, MIO, D.A.d.W., Berlin, 1957, Band V, Heft 1, pp. 91–112
- On Some Problems of Using the Auxiliary Verbs in Tibetan, MIO, D.A.d.W., Berlin, 1959, Band VII, Heft 1, pp. 79–122
- The Numerical System of Classification of Catchwords in Tibetan Lexicography, ZDMG, Wiesbaden, 1959, Band 109, Heft 2, pp. 74–82
- The Tonal System of Tibetan (Lhasa Dialect), T´oung Pao, Leiden, 1959, Vol. XLVII, Livraison 3–5, pp. 181–250
- Tibetische Übersetzungsweise von Zeitwörtern des Ergebnisses und der Richtung aus dem Chinesischen, Journal of the American Oriental Society, Vol. 82, Number 2, April–June, 1962, S. 170-189
- Zur Frage der Nota Temporis -mjong im Tibetischen, MIO, D.A.d.W., Berlin, 1964, Band X, Heft 2–3, pp. 351–384
- Zum Instrumentalsuffix hnang im Barmanischen und dang im Tibetischen, ZDMG, Band 112, Heft 1, Wiesbaden, 1962, pp. 159–169
- Zur Frage der Entstehung der tibetischen interverbalen Partikel MUS, JOAS, Vol. 82, Number 1, Jan.-March, 1962, pp. 51–55
- Die e-Verbalphrasen des zeitgenössischen Tibetischen, Central Asiatic Journal, Band VII, Heft 2, June 1962, pp. 96–118
- Zur Frage der Etymologie der tangutischen Partikeln *ta, *ngu, *ri, *ki, *to und *Ršo, Central Asiatic Journal, Vol. VII, Number 3, Sept., 1962, pp. 153–169
- K.S, - Semičov B, V.: K voprosu o translitěraciji i fonětičeskoj transkripciji sovremennogo tibetskogo jazyka posredstvom russkogo alfavita (Zur Frage der Transliteration und phonetischen Transkription der heutigen tibetischen Sprache mittels des russischen Alphabets) Trudy BKNII (Abhandlungen des Burjätischen wiss. Komplexforschungsinstituts), Heft Nr. 6, Ulan-Ude, 1962, S. 125-136
- Von den verbalen Partikeln *le, *zi, *thal und *si des Osttibetischen (Derge Dialekt), ZDMG, Band 113, Heft 3, Wiesbaden 1964, pp. 579–596
- New Light on the Name of the Tangut People of the Hsi-Hsia Dynasty, ZDMG, Band 114, Heft 1, Wiesbaden, 1964, pp. 180–185
- Existierte ein Lautgesetz in zusammengesetzten Anlauten des Profo-Sino-Tibetischen?, Central Asiatic Journal, Vol. VII, Number 4, Dec., 1962, pp. 270–311
- K.S. – Semičov B.V., Ješčo o transkripciji i translitěraciji tibetskogo jazyka, Matěrially po istoriji i filologiji Centraĺnoj Aziji (Nochmals zur Transkription und Transliteration der tibetischen Sprache), Trudy BKNII SO AN SSSR (Abhandlungen der Burjätischen wiss. Komplexforschungsinstituts, Sibirische Abt. der Akademie der Wissenschaften der UdSSR), Heft Nr. 16, Ulan-Ude, 1965, S. 132-144
- Signs of Partial Phonetic Reversion in Tibetan, Central Asiatic Journal, Vol. IX, No. 1, March, 1964, The Hague-Wiesbaden, pp. 60–75
- K.S. – Semičov, B.V. – Kuzněcov, B.I. Chrestomatija (Tibetskije těksty) Chrestomatie (Tibetische Texte), Sankt-Petersburger Universitätsverlag (20 Druckbogen - (im Druck)
- Nochmals zur Frage der Entstehung des archaisch-chinesischen Präfixes *s- , Journal of the American Oriental Society, Vol. 83, Nr. 4, Sept.-Dec., 1963, pp. 502–514
- Über das *-r- in den zusammengesetzten Anlauten der sino-khmerischen Lexeme, Central Asiatic Journal, Vol. IX, No. 3, Sept. 1964, The Hague-Wiesbaden, 1964, pp. 160–170
- Von der Frikativa *-δ- in Sibilantenreihen des Altchinesischen, ZDMG, Band 116, Heft 1, Wiesbaden, 1966, pp. 160–170
- On Some Tibetan *s-, *d- Initial Clusters and Their Metathetical Forms in Sino-Tibetan Lexemes, ORBIS, Louvain, 1964, Tome XIII, No. 2, pp. 556–567
- On the Use of Plural Markers in Modern Tibetan, Central Asiatic Journal, Vol. XII, No.4, Wiesbaden, 1969, pp. 309–321
- Vremenno-vidovoj ottěnok odnoj glagoĺnoj konstrukciji sovremennogo litěraturnogo tibetskogo (Temporale u. Aspektabstufung einer Verbalkonstruktion der heutigen tibetischen Schriftsprache), Matěrially po istoriji i filologiji Central´noj Aziji (Materialien zur Historie und Philologie Zentralasiens, Heft Nr.4, Ulan-Ude, S. 54–57.
- Khongs and its Grammaticized Usage in Modern Literary Tibetan, ZDMG, Band 118, Heft 2, Wiesbaden, 1968, pp. 367–372
- The Law of Phonetic Change in Initial Clusters in Common Sino-Tibetan, Monumenta Serica, Vol. XXVI, 1967, pp. 6–34
- Das Gemein-Sino-Tibetibetische, Abhandlungen fuer die Kunde des Morgenlandes, Band XXXIX, Steiner Verlag, Wiesbaden, 1970, pp. i-vii, 1-91
- K funkcionaĺnomu opreděleniju osnovnych častic v tibetskom jazyke (Zur Funktionsbestimmung der Grundpartikeln in der tibetischen Sprache), TIBETICA, Matěrially tibetologičeskogo seminara, SO AN SSSR, Burjatskij filial (Materialien des tibetologischen Seminars, Sibirische Abt. der Akademie der Wissenschaften der UdSSR, Burjätische Zweigstelle), Ulan-Ude, 1971, Heft Nr. 1, S. 71–85.
- The Chinese Tax Term ch‛ai-fa- - a Tibetan Loan-Word?, Monumenta Serica, Vol. XXVIII, 1969, pp. 215–229
- The Use of rkjen and stabs in Modern Written Tibetan, MIO, D.A.d.W., Berlin, 1971, Band XVII, Heft 1, pp. 130–139
- Čes, žes, šes v sovremennom tibetskom jazyke (Čes, žes, šes in der heutigen tibetischen Sprache), TIBETICA, Matěrially tibetologičeskogo seminara (Materialien des tibetologischen Seminars, SO AN SSSR (Sibirische Abt. der Akademie der Wissenschjaften der UdSSR, (Burjätische Zweigstelle), Ulan-Ude, 1971, Heft Nr. 1, S. 63–70.
- Tibetan Newspaper Reader, Part 1: Preface, Tibetan texts transliterated and translated into English, pp. i-xvi, 1-201
- Tibetan Newspaper Reader, Part 2: Short Grammatical Notes, pp. 202–356
- Tibetan Newspaper Reader, Part 3: A Tibetan–English Dictionary, pp. 357–1114
- Tibetan Newspaper Reader, Part 4: Tibetan Written Texts in the dBu-čan Script, pp. 1–75
- VEB Verlag Enzyklopädie, Leipzig, 1972, Band 1, pp. i-xvi, 1–368, Band 2: pp. 1–520
- Ob upotrebleniji častic -pa,-ba v sovremennom tibetskom jazyke (Über den Gebrauch der Partikeln -pa, -ba in der heutigen tibetischen Sprache), TIBETICA, Ulan-Ude (Jahr der Veröffentlichung unbekannt).
- Vorwort, Redigierung und Korrektur der Publikation INTRODUCTION TO SINO-TIBETAN by Robert Shafer, Part 5, Wiesbaden, 1974, pp. i-xvi, 409-525
- The Yeniseian Languages of the 18th Century and Ket and Sino-Tibetan Word Comparisons - Central Asiatic Journal 52 (2008) 2, pp. 219–305.

=== Reviews ===
- Kratkij tibetsko-russkij slovaŕ (Kurzgefasstes tibetisch-russisches Wörterbuch) von B.V.Semičov, Ju.M.Parfionovič, B.D. Dandaron, Moskau, 1963, S. 1–581, ver-öffentlicht in Matěrially po istoriji i filologiji Centraĺnoj Aziji, vypusk 2, Trudy BKNII SO AN SSSR (Materialen zur Historie und Philologie Zentralasiens, Heft 2, Trudy BKNII SO AN SSSR (Abhandlungen des Burjätischen wiss. Komplexforschungsinstituts, Sibirische Abt der Akademie der Wissenschaften der UdSSR), Heft Nr. 16, Ulan-Ude, 1965, S. 234-255
- Grundlagen der Phonetik des Lhasa-Dialektes, von Eberh. Richter, Berlin, 1964, pp. i-vii, 1-269+1 S., Nachwort, veröffentlicht in Orientalische Literaturzeitung, 63, Jahrgang 1968, Nr. 7/8, S. 407-409
- Tibeto-Mongolica – The Tibetan Loan-Words of Monguor and the Development of the Archaic Tibetan Dialects by Róna-Tas, A. Mouton and Co., The Hague, 1966, pp. 1–232, veröffentlicht in ZDMG, Band 118, Heft 2, Wiesbaden, 1968, S. 221-222
- Kitajskaja klassika v tangutskom perevodě (Luň Juj, Men-Czy, Sjao Czin) (Chinesische Klassik in tangutischer Übersetzung – Luň Juj, Men-Czy, Siao-Czin) von V.S. Kolokolov, E.I.Kyčanov, Moskau, 1966, S. 1-148, 1-211, veröffentlicht in ZDMG, Band 118, Heft 2, Wiesbaden, 1968, S. .223-224
- The Khmer Language by Y.A.Gorgoniyev, Moscow, 1966, pp. 1–136, transl. from Russian by V.Korotky, veröffentlicht in JAS, Vol. 89, No. 1, Jan.-March, 1969, S. 273-275
- Bibliography of Sino-Tibetan Languages, by R. Shafer, Otto Harrassowitz Verlag, Wiesbaden, 1957, S. i-xi, 1-211, veröffentlicht in ZDMG, Band 118, Wiesbaden, 1968, S. 222-223
- Tibetisch-deutsches Wörterbuch von Eberh. Richter, VEB Verlag Enzyklopädie, Leipzig, 1966, S. 1-444, veröffentlicht in Orientalische Literaturzeitung, No. 65, Jahrgang 1970, Nr. 11/12, S. 591-593
- Ob osnovach transkripciji i translitěraciji dlja tibetskogo jazyka (Über die Grundlagen der Transkription und Transliteration für die tibetische Sprache) von B.-.D. Badarajev, SO AN SSSR (Sibirische Abteilung der Akademie der Wissenschaften der UdSSR), Ulan-Ude, 1967, S. 1-193, veröffentlicht in Voprosy jazykoznanija (Probleme der Sprachkunde) Nr. 5, Moskau, 1969, S.. 131-133
- Introduction to Sino-Tibetan by Robert Shafer, Part 1,2, Wiesbaden, 1966–1967, p. i-vii, 1-120, 121-216, veröffentlicht in ZDMG, Band 120, Heft 2, Wiesbaden, 1970, S. 412-413
- Introduction to Sino-Tibetan, by Robert Shafer, Part 3, Wiesbaden, 1968, S. 217-312, veröffentlicht in ZDMG, Band 120, Heft 2, Wiesbaden, 1970, S. . 413-414
- Introduction to Cambodian by Judith M. Jacob, Oxford University Press, London, 1968, S. i-xii, 1-341, veröffentlicht in ZDMG, Band 120, Heft 2, Wiesbaden, 1970, S. 415-416
- More pis´men – faksimile tangutskich ksilografov (Das Meer der Buchstaben – ein Faksimile tangutischer Xylographen), übersetzt von K.B. Kepping, V.S.Kolokolov, E.I.Kyčanov, A.P. Těrent´jev-Katanskij, Moskau, 1969, Vol 1-2, veröffentlicht in ZDMG, Band 120, Heft 2, Wiesbaden, 1970, S. 416-417
- Tibetan–English Dictionary with Supplement by Stuart H. Buck, The Catholic University of America Press, Washington, D.C., 1969, S. i-xvii, 1-833, veröffentlicht in ZDMG, Band 123, Heft 1, Wiesbaden, 1973, S. 191-192
- Introduction to Sino-Tibetan by Robert Shafer, Part 4, Otto Harrassowitz Verlag, Wiesbaden, 1970, S. 313-408, veröffentlicht in ZDMG, Band 123, Heft 1, Wiesbaden, 1973, S. 189-190
- Tibetskij pis´mennyj jazyk (Tibetische Schriftsprache) von Ju. Parfionovič, NAUKA Verlag, Moskau, 1970, S. 1-182, veröffentlicht in ZDMG, Band 123, Heft 1, Wiesbaden, 1973, S. 190-191
- Lehrbuch der klassischen tibetischen Schriftsprache mit Lesestücken und Glossar von Michael Hahn, 2. Auflage, Hamburg, 1972, S. 1-11, 1-360, veröffentlicht in ZDMG, Band 124, Heft 1, Wiesbaden, 1974, S. 207-208
- Sino-Tibetan: A Conspectus by Paul K. Benedict, Cambridge, 1972, Cambridge University Press, 1-11, 1-230, veröffentlicht in ZDMG, Band 124, Heft 1, Wiesbaden, 1974, S. 205-206
- Structure of the Syllable in Cantonese by Diana L.Kao, Mouton, 1971, The Hague-Paris, S. 1-189, veröffentlicht in ZDMG, Band 125, Heft 1, Wiesbaden, 1975, S. 234
- Les Adverbes en Chinois Moderne by Viviane Alleton, Mouton, Le Haye-Paris, 1972, pp. 1–249, veröffentlicht in ZDMG, Band 125, Heft 1, Wiesbaden, 1975, S. 232-233
- Tibetan Civilization by R-.A. Stein, Faber and Faber, London, 1962, S. 1-334, veröffentlicht in ZDMG, Band 125, Heft 1, Wiesbaden, 1975, S. 225-226
- Märchen aus Vietnam by Otto Karrow, Eugen-Diederichs Verlag, Düsseldorf-Köln, 1972, S. 1-278, veröffentlicht in ZDMG, Band 125, Heft 1, Wiesbaden, 1975, S. 230-231
- Vietnamesich-deutsches Wörterbuch by Otto Karow, Otto Harrassowitz Verlag, Wiesbaden, 1972, S. i-xv, 1-1086, veröffentlicht in ZDMG, Band 125, Heft 1, Wiesbaden, 1975, S. 229-230
- The Prague Collection of Tibetan Prints from Derge by Josef Kolmaš, Vol.: pp. 1–517, Vol.: S. 1-681, ACADEMIA, Prague, 1971, veröffentlicht in Asian and African Studies, Vol. XI, Bratislava, 1975, S. . 265-267
- The Loloish Tonal Split Revisited by James A. Matisoff, Research Monograph No 7, Center for South and South East Asia Studies, University of California, Berkeley, 1972, veröffentlicht in ZDMG, Band 125, Heft 1, Wiesbaden, 1975, S. . 227-228
- The Grammar of Lahu by James A. Matisoff, University of California Publications, Linguistics 75, Berkeley, 1973, S. i-ii, 1-673, veröffentlicht in ZDMG, Band 127, Heft 2, Wiesbaden, 1977, S. 441-442
- Miao and Yao Linguistic Studies, Selected Articles in Chinese translated by Chang Yü-Hung and Chu Kwo-Ray, edited by Herbert C. Purnell, Linguistic Series VII, Data paper: No. 88, Cornell. Univ., Ithaca, New York, Nov. 1972, S. i-xiv, 1-282, veröffentlicht in ZDMG, Band 127, Heft 2, Wiesbaden, 1977, S. 442-444
- White Meo-English Dictionary by Ernest E. Heimbach, Linguistic Series IV, Data paper: No. 75, Cornell Univ., Ithaca, New York, 1969, S. i-xxv, 1-497, veröffentlicht in ZDMG, Band 127, Heft 2, Wiesbaden, 1977, S. 444-445
- Cambodian System of Writing and Beginning Reader by Franklin E. Huffman, Yale Linguistic Series, Yale University Press, New Haven, 1970, S. i-xii, 1-365, veröffentlicht in ZDMG, Band 127, Heft 2, Wiesbaden, 1977, S. 445-446
- Intermediate Cambodian Reader by Franklin E. Huffman, Yale Linguistic Series, Yale University Press, New Haven, 1972, S. i-viii, 1-502, veröffentlicht in ZDMG, Band 127, Heft 2, Wiesbaden, 1977, S. 446
- Modern Spoken Cambodian by Franklin E.Huffman, Yale Linguistic Series, Yale University Press, New Haven, 1970, S. i-xiv, 1-451, veröffentlicht in ZDMG, Band 128, Heft 1, Wiesbaden, 1978, S. 189
- Lao–English Dictionary by Allen D. Kern, Vol. 1: i-xxiv, 1-616 pp, Vol. 2: Seiten 617–1223, Consortium Press, The Catholic University of America Press, Washington, D.C., 1972, veröffentlicht in ZDMG, Band 128, Heft 1, Wiesbaden, 1978, S. 190-191
