= Anne Tanqueray =

English silversmith

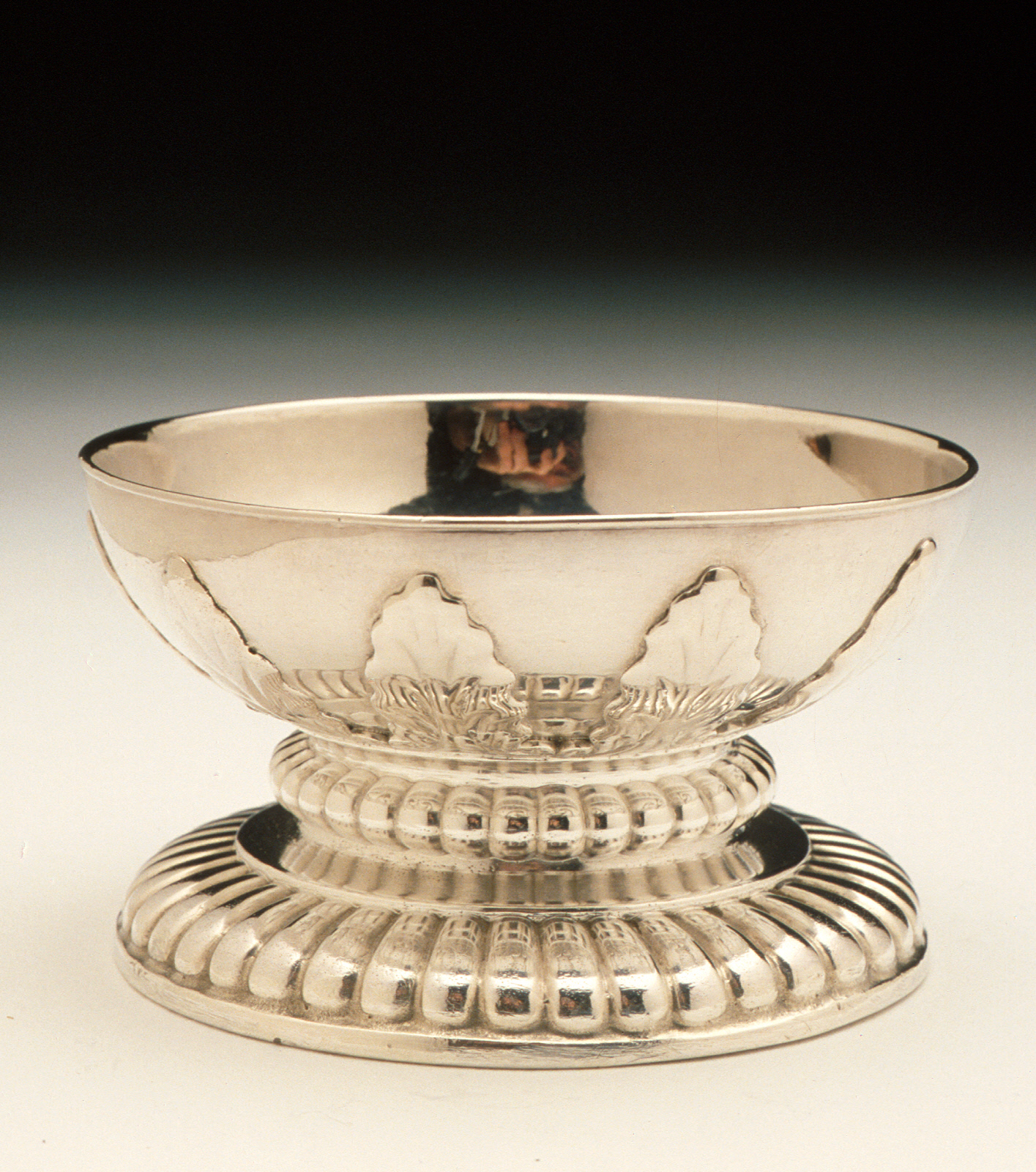
- Set of Four Salts, Clark Art Institute
- Born: Anne Willaume; 1691
- Died: 1733 (aged 41–42); Tingrith, England
- Known for: Metalwork

Anne Tanqueray née Willaume (1691–1733) was an English silversmith, active from 1724–1733.

== Early life ==
Anne Tanqueray was born in 1691 to David Willaume I, a prominent Huguenot silversmith, who had come to London from France in 1685.

== Career ==
Tanqueray's husband established a workshop, and it is likely that Tanqueray created items bearing her husband's mark. Upon her husband's death, after 1724, she took over his business and she entered two marks (Sterling and New Standard) in the register at Goldsmiths' Hall. Her marks appeared alongside her husband's original 1713 mark, with his name being struck through and hers written above, as opposed to a new entry, which was custom for a widow. This appears to be the only instance in which this happened.

As a female silversmith in the 18th century, Tanqueray would have had the opportunity to produce her own work and oversee skilled journeymen. Tanqueray's workshop was noted for its high level of excellence and in 1729 it became Subordinate Goldsmith to the King.

== Personal life ==
In 1717, she married David Tanqueray, her father's apprentice; they had two sons.

== Death ==
Tanqueray died in 1733 and was buried in Tingrith on 25 July that year.

== Legacy ==
Examples of Tanqueray's work can be found at Temple Newsam, Huguenot Museum in Rochester, Kent, Victoria and Albert Museum, Amgueddfa Cymru – Museum Wales, Welbeck Abbey, and the Clark Art Institute collections.
