= Tomáš Sedláček =

Tomáš Sedláček may refer to:

- Tomáš Sedláček (general) (1918–2012), Czech general
- Tomáš Sedláček (economist) (born 1977), Czech economist
- Tomáš Sedláček (footballer) (born 1980), Czech footballer
