= Ksenija Voishal =

Belarusian basketball player

Olimpia Grodno
- Position: Guard
- League: Belarusian League

Personal information
- Born: 18 October 1994 (age 32) Grodno, Belarus
- Listed height: 5 ft 11 in (1.80 m)

Ksenija Voishal (born on 18 October 1994) is a Belarusian basketball player for Olimpia Grodno and the Belarusian national team, where she participated at the 2014 FIBA World Championship.
