= Michal Sedláček =

Czech footballer

Personal information
- Date of birth: 27 October 1988 (age 38)
- Place of birth: Mladá Boleslav, Czechoslovakia
- Height: 1.75 m (5 ft 9 in)
- Position: Midfielder

Senior career*
| Years | Team | Apps | (Gls) |
| 2007–2012 | FK Mladá Boleslav | 31 | (3) |
| 2011 | → Bohemians 1905 (loan) | 12 | (3) |
- * Club domestic league appearances and goals as of 30 June 2011

Michal Sedláček (born 27 October 1988 ) is a Czech football player who plays as a midfielder for Bohemians 1905 in the Czech First League.
