= Kateřina Sedláková =

Czech basketball player

Valosun KP Brno
- Position: Guard
- League: ZBL

Personal information
- Born: April 28, 1990 (age 36)
- Listed height: 5 ft 9 in (1.75 m)

Kateřina Sedláková (born 28 April 1990) is a Czech basketball player for Valosun KP Brno and the Czech national team, where she participated at the 2014 FIBA World Championship.
