= Ingrid Tanqueray =

French basketball player

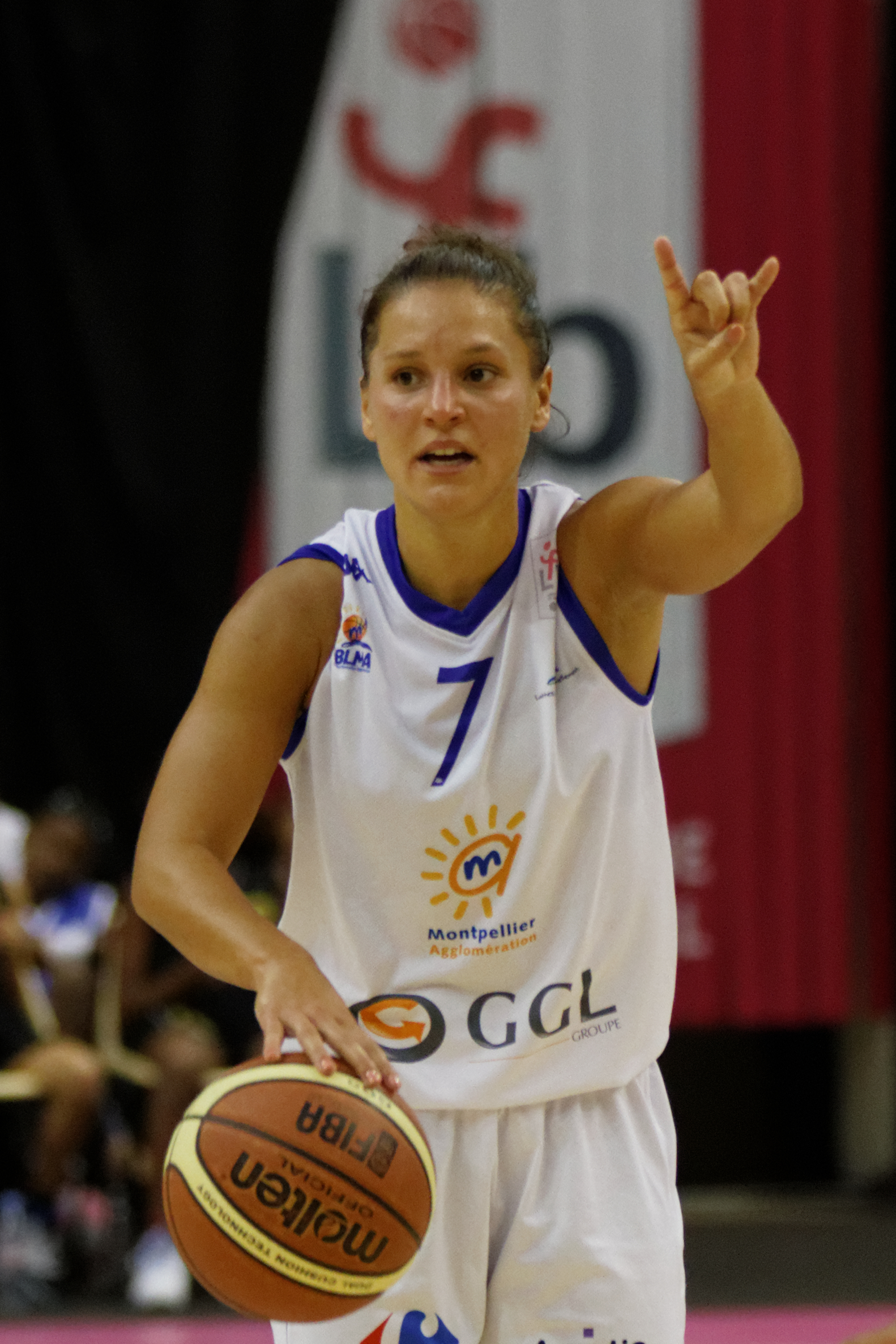

Basket Lattes
- Position: Guard
- League: LFB

Personal information
- Born: August 25, 1988 (age 38) Caen
- Listed height: 5 ft 5 in (1.65 m)

Ingrid Tanqueray (born 25 August 1988) is a French basketball player for Basket Lattes and the French national team, where she participated at the 2014 FIBA World Championship.
