= Olga Vashkevich =

Belarusian basketball player

BC Tsmoki-Minsk
- Position: Forward
- League: Belarusian League

Personal information
- Born: October 27, 1988 (age 38) Minsk, Belarus
- Listed height: 6 ft 2 in (1.88 m)

Olga Vashkevich (born 27 October 1988) is a Belarusian basketball player for BC Tsmoki-Minsk and the Belarusian national team, where she participated at the 2014 FIBA World Championship.
