= Geology of the Australian Capital Territory =

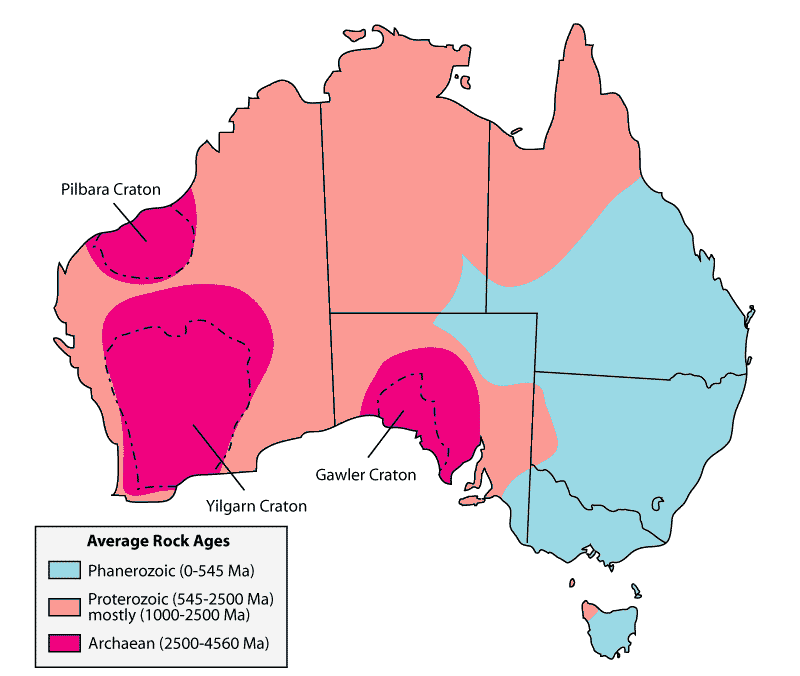
Australia grew around three fused pieces of very ancient continental crust (cratons).

The geology of the Australian Capital Territory includes rocks dating from the Ordovician around 480 million years ago, whilst most rocks are from the Silurian. During the Ordovician period the region—along with most of eastern Australia—was part of the ocean floor. The area contains the Pittman Formation consisting largely of quartz-rich sandstone, siltstone and shale; the Adaminaby Beds and the Acton Shale.

Most of the younger rocks are pyroclastic deposits from explosive volcanic eruptions, but the Yarralumla Formation is a sedimentary mudstone/siltstone formation that was formed around 425 million years ago.

In the 1840s fossils of brachiopods and trilobites from the Silurian period were discovered at Woolshed Creek near Duntroon by the Reverend William Branwhite Clarke. At the time these were the oldest fossils discovered in Australia, though this record has since been far surpassed. Other specific geological places of interest include the State Circle cutting and the Deakin anticline.

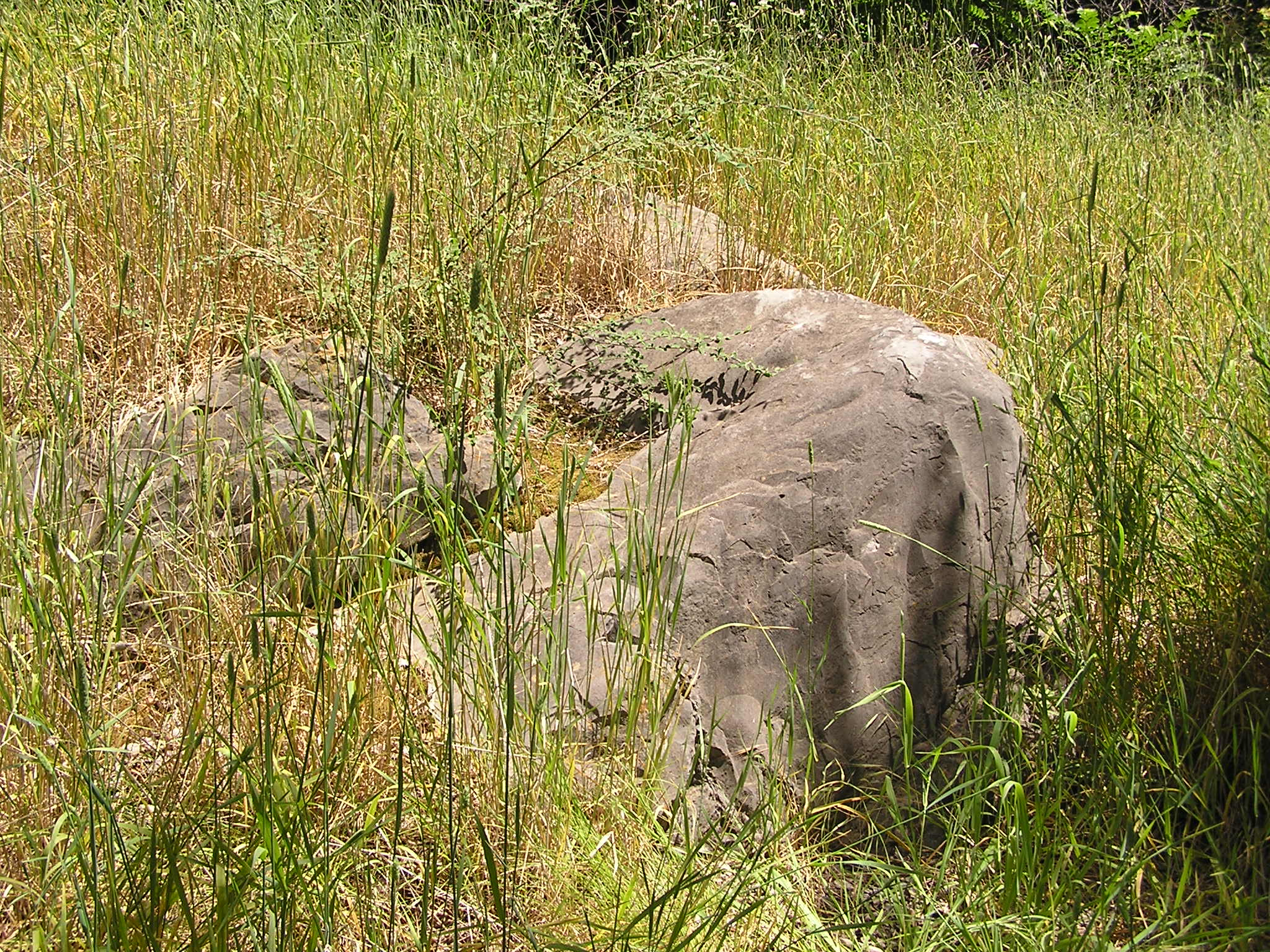
Limestone outcrop at Acton

The early European name for the district was "Limestone Plains". In 1820, following the discovery of Lake George and the Yass River, Governor Lachlan Macquarie decided to send a party, with provisions for one month, to discover the Murrumbidgee River. Joseph Wild was accompanied by James Vaughan, a constable, and Charles Throsby Smith, a nephew of the explorer Charles Throsby. Detailed instructions had been given to the explorers by Charles Throsby, who had accompanied the Lake George exploration party earlier in the year. They were provided with acid to test for limestone. On 7 December 1820, Smith recorded in his journal:

... Came on to one of the plains we saw at 11 o’clock. At half past 1, came to a very extensive plain, fine Rich Soil and plenty of grass. Came to a Beautiful River plains that was running thro' the plains in a S.W. direction, by the side of which we slept that night. When we made the Hut this evening, we saw several pieces of stone that had been burnt by all appearances. I then examined some of it, which proved to be limestone. ...

There is little limestone evident at the surface in the district, but an outcrop at Acton, near the Museum of Australia, by the shores of Lake Burley Griffin. These formations became exposed when the ocean floor was raised by a major volcanic activity in the Devonian forming much of the east coast of Australia.

Much of the western and southern parts of the Australian Capital Territory (ACT) are made from granite-like rocks. These are from the Murrumbidgee Batholith intruding during the late Silurian or early Devonian times.

== Tectonic context ==
Tectonics explains the large-scale structure of the Earth's crust and its constituent rocks in terms of blocks moving along faults, uplifted into horsts or downthrown into grabens. The ACT is positioned on the Australian continent, which was once a part of the supercontinent Gondwana. The ACT is in the Tasmanides, the deformed rocks of the orogen that make up the core of the old mountain range that makes up the Australian continent east of the Tasman Line. These rocks are an addition to the Proterozoic core of the continent. The Tasmanides are the result of compression, horizontal shortening, and vertical thickening of various "terranes" such as small continental fragments and volcanic island arcs that were plastered against the original continental margin as a result of plate tectonic movements.

The Tasmanides also extended into Antarctica in the south and northern China in the north, as these continental units were attached to Australia at the time, in Gondwana.

The ACT is part of the Eastern Lachlan Fold Belt, which is located on a terrane that is called the Benambra Terrane in Victoria, but the Molong-Monaro Terrane in New South Wales.

=== Canberra region structure ===
- Rocky Pic Horst outside the east of ACT.
  - Narongo Fault
- Captains Flat Graben (easternmost 3 km of ACT)
  - Ballallaba Fault
- Cullarin Horst (north of Queanbeyan, Oaks Estate, most of Kowen)
  - Collingwood, Queanbeyan, Sullivans Faults
- Canberra Graben (north east ACT including Canberra, and Williamsdale

also known as Canberra-Yass Synclinorial Zone East

  - Murrumbidgee, Winslade, Pig Hill Fault
- Cotter Horst
  - Tantangara Fault
- Goodradigbee Graben

also known as Canberra-Yass Synclinorial Zone west

  - Long Plain Fault
- Cowra Trough outside the west of the ACT

== Geological history ==
=== Ordovician ===
A plate with a continent fragment on board bumped into the east coast of what is now Australia, forming the Delamerian Orogeny. The remains of the mountains of this orogeny can be found near Broken Hill and in eastern South Australia, western Victoria, and western Tasmania. This happened between 520 and 480 million years ago up to the Cambrian period. No associated ocean floor has been preserved by obduction in the ACT.

During the Palaeozoic era at least a few thousand kilometres of the ocean floor were subducted, taking of the order of a hundred million years. Sediments were deposited in the ocean floor in the form of fans formed by turbidity currents off the side of a continental slope. The flow was in the northerly direction, indicating that the continental slope was to the south. These deposits occurred during the Ordovician period. The ocean floor was distant from the continental source of the sediment. Towards the end of this period there were isolated parts where no turbidity currents reached and only fine clay and animal organic and silica debris were deposited into oxygen-depleted deep water. This ocean basin has been called the Monaro Basin. To the north west was a volcanic chain of islands, the Macquarie arc, with an associated submarine trench.

The subducting Pacific plate was old, cold and dense, easily sinking into the mantle at a steep angle. The hinge zone of the plate also migrated oceanwards over time. So the trench retreated oceanwards, and the old trench and ocean floor become part of the continental plate. Volcanoes formed inwards from the trench. The part of the oceanic plate attached to the continent was compressed, the suboceanic crust was severely shortened and thickened as well, giving rise to a duplex structure. This happened at the end of the Ordovician period and in the Early Silurian. The sediments were heavily folded and overthrusted resulting in severe crustal shortening. In the Canberra area the sediments were raised above sea level and eroded. The land to the west (around Wagga Wagga) was raised higher. An unconformity resulted between the Pittman Formation and the State Circle Shale and Black Mountain Sandstone deposited on top.

=== Silurian deposition ===
State Circle Shale and Black Mountain Sandstone deposited in a marine environment as turbidites. The source of the Black Mountain sand was near by from the west, from the Wagga Wagga area. The Canberra area was on the proto-Canberra-Yass Shelf. East of Canberra deep water of the Monaro Basin remained in the Captains Flat area.

A second unconformity occurred after the Black Mountain Sandstone was uplifted and eroded at the end of the early Silurian. This was called the Quidongan Deformation. The Canberra formation was deposited in shallow water with limestone, and shale forming. There were some small volcanic activities at this stage with dacite and ashstone layers included.

Several stages of volcanic activity followed. The first stage with Paddys River Volcanics, Walker Volcanics in west Canberra, Hawkins Volcanics in the north and Ainslie Volcanics in the north east had acidic lava volcanoes erupting. The next stage was Mount Painter Volcanics in middle Canberra, and Colinton Volcanics south of Queanbeyan and near Williamsdale. Then came a pause in volcanism at the start of the Upper Silurian with the Yarralumla Formation and Yass Formation sedimentary deposits. Volcanic activity resumed with Deakin Volcanics in the north west and south of Canberra. First rhyodacite was erupted followed by tuff, more rhyodacite, tuff with some underwater sediments, and finishing with rhyolite. At least four large eruptions made up this volcanic deposit. Over the top of this in the west near the Murrumbidgee River there was a further massive volcanic eruption, called Laidlaw Volcanics.

West of the Murrumbidgee is another different geological setting. The tectonic block is called the Cotter Horst. This was probably in a different position relative to Canberra, compared to the present. From here, ocean floor turbidite deposits occurred in the Ordovician period. The sediments were deeply buried by being compressed and faulted down. Melting occurred in deep sediments and in the basaltic oceanic crust beneath. The magmas mingled and intruded upwards. The Murrumbidgee Batholith was formed, with several intrusions. The faults were reversed and the granites from the batholith became elevated.

=== Devonian ===
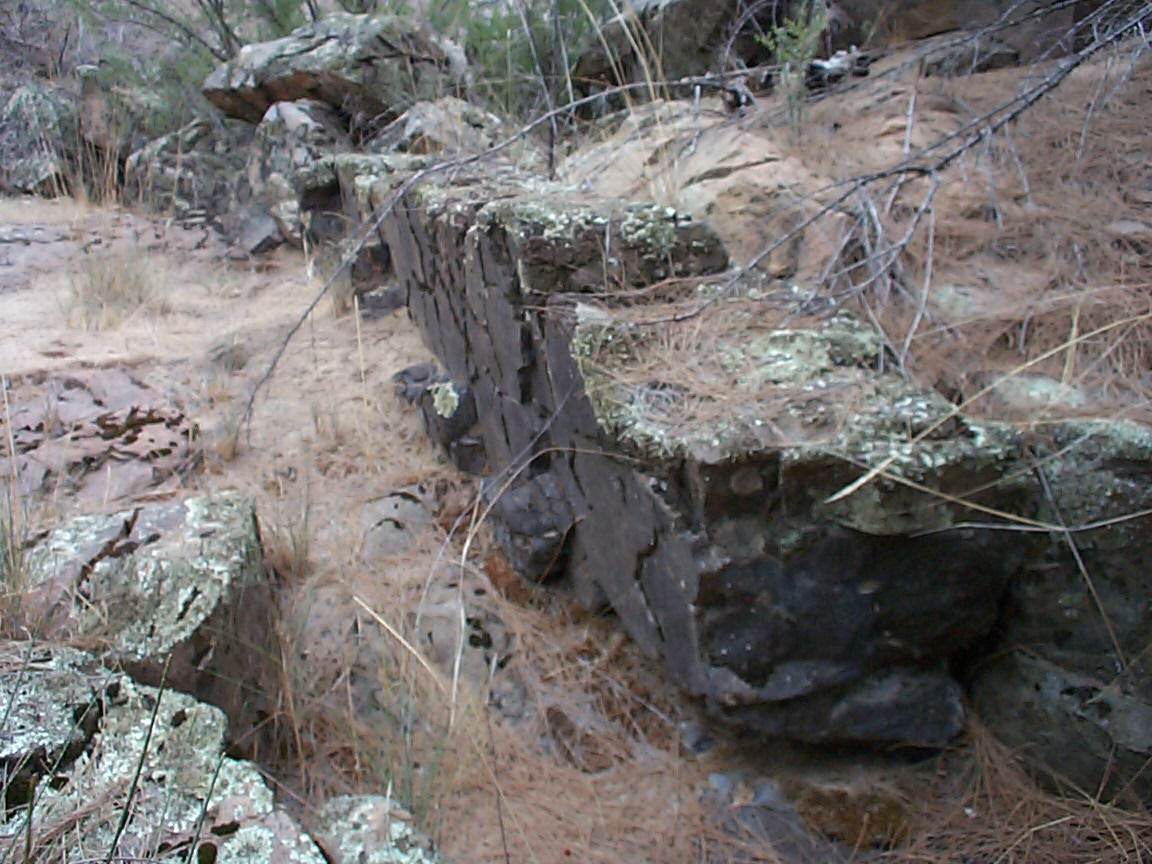
Dyke of teschenite

Small granite intrusions injected the rocks in the Canberra Graben around 408 million years ago. The Molong-Monaro Terrane was carried into position on the east coast of Australia.

The Bowning Deformation caused the north–south faulting and long folding in the area surrounding the ACT. This deformation was connected with the attachment of the terrane to the continent. During this stage metamorphism occurred. In the Canberra Graben and Cullarin Block, metamorphism mostly reached the upper greenschist stage, with shallow burial and temperature below 350 °C. This changed the volcanics and sediments with sericitisation, saussuritisation, conversion of plagioclase to albite, and conversion of biotite to chlorite, titanite, epidote and opaque minerals. On the western margin in southwest Belconnen, Duffy, and Kambah in the Laidlaw and Walker Volcanics the temperature was lower and prehnite-pumpellyite facies was achieved. This was not sufficient to convert plagioclase to albite.

More intense metamorphism occurred to the east of the Googong Dam, east of the ACT on the Molonglo Range and Yarrow Peak and Taliesin Hills. Psammitic schist and pellitic schist occur there. Within this region, there are two parallel belts of knotted schist even more strongly heated to over 525 °C. The temperature gradient in the area was high at 70 °C per kilometre.

In the east side of the Cullarin Block, in the east-pointing finger of the ACT, the Tabberabberan Orogeny also reached the upper greenschist facies again. East–west pressure caused ruptures forming the Winslade and Deakin Faults and other northwest- or northeast-trending faults.

A dyke of olivine teschenite intruded into the Red Rocks Gorge area of the Murrumbidgee River. The Kosiusko uplift elevated the land in the Snowy Mountains and Southern Highlands areas. This uplift reactivated the Murrumbidgee Fault, the Queanbeyan Fault and the Lake George Fault.

== Mining ==
Minor mining operations have occurred historically throughout the region, both for precious metals including gold, silver, lead, and copper, and for construction materials. The only commercial operations now here are the Stockmans Quarry at Pialligo which excavates Camp Hill Sandstone, and a large quarry on Mount Mugga Mugga which excavates Mugga Mugga Porphyry for construction gravel and concrete mix.

A deposit of galena and copper carbonate was tunneled in the Balconnel Gold Mine around 1894. No significant gold was ever found there. The mine was 200 m downstream from the Molonglo River on the Murrumbidgee River with coordinates 35°S deg 14' 38.3", 148°E deg 58' 13.6".

Paddys River Mine or Cowley copper mine is located 700 m upstream on Paddys River. The host rock is a skarn where Shannons Flat Adamellite baked limestone from the Paddy's River Volcanics. The bulk of the mineral here is magnetite, but other sulfide and minerals of copper, lead zinc and silver attracted miners. Thomas Coyle operated the mine in 1895, producing 2.6 tons of copper and 26.1 kg of silver. In 1907 the Cowley Copper Syndicate Ltd started more work cutting two more adits and winzes. It was abandoned by 1909 as the ore was too low grade. More than a million tons of magnetite remain. Many minerals such as aurichalcite, bronchanite, caledonite, cerussite, hemimorphite, hydrozincite, linarite, native silver, rozenite, and zincsilite have been found at the location.

== Lithology ==
=== Ordovician ===
Pittman Formation Chemical Analysis
oxide	% or ppm
SiO_{2}	71.23%
TiO_{2}	0.64%
Al_{2}O_{3}	13.76%
FeO	4.74%
MnO	0.05%
MgO	1.90%
CaO	0.31%
Na_{2}O	1.02%
K_{2}O	3.54%
P_{2}O_{5}	0.13%
Rb	168 ppm
Sr	64 ppm

Pittman Formation

The Pittman Formation was described originally by Öpik in 1958 who named it after the Pittman Valley, southeast of Aranda, Australian Capital Territory. It is entirely of Ordovician age and about 800 metres thick near Canberra, but at Captains Flat it is over 1,200 metres thick. The lower levels are greywacke, exposed east of Queanbeyan and north are very thick and heavily overturned and thrusted. At Etheridge Creek, the type locality is a repeating pattern of sandstone, micaceous sandy shale, mudstone, black argillaceous and radiolarian chert. In the sandstone beds there are occurrences of graded bedding, clay pellets, and current bedding. Fossils of graptolites, radiolarians, conodonts, and occasionally brachiopods and sponges are found. The geological formation east of Queanbeyan used to be known as the Muriarra Formation. This alternates between sandstone with a high quartz content and mica, and phyllite. Radiolarian chert is found in the central section. The railway forms the border between Queanbeyan in NSW and Oaks Estate in the ACT. West of the Queanbeyan railway station is a cutting where folding has overturned the beds, with axes dipping to the east at 50 degrees. 300 metres of thickness is exposed in this cutting. Llanvirnian age (Pygodus serrus conodont zone). Fossils found include Phyllograptus anna, Trigonograptus ensiformus, Pterograptus, Didymograptus, Isograptus, Hallograptus from the Darriwillian age. Near the top of the formation are fossils Dicellograptus sextans, D divaricatus, D salopiensis, which are Gisbornian.

Chemical analysis reveals low concentrations of sodium, calcium and strontium because of the low feldspar content.

The Ordovician turbidites, consisting of greywacke, feldspathic sandstone, micaceous siltstone, micaceous shale, chert, and phyllite, are very similar in all parts of the Tasman Orogen, including New Zealand and the Transantarctic Mountains. Detrital zircons from the turbidites have been isotopically dated with age ranges of 0.46 and 0.60 Gya, 1.0 and 1.2 Gya, and at ~1.8 Gya, ~2.2 Gya and ~2.7 Gya. These do not match the age of zircons from the interior of the Australian Shield, so the source of the sediments is from another continent. The other evidence from the Ordovician sediments are chemical composition indicates granitic source, with the absence of feldspar. Secondly the fine grained nature shows the sediments have been transported a long way from their ultimate, source, and could have been second cycle, derived from sedimentary rocks.

At the time these sediments were deposited the location was at least 3,000 km from the Australian continent. Underneath there is no Proterozoic continental basement, instead these sediments are lying on top of oceanic crust.

Acton Shale

Acton Shale is a grey to black thinly laminated siliceous shale containing graptolites. It is generally leached, and frequently silicified. The colour of the beds alternates between grey and black, but where weathered, it changes to whitish grey. The graptolites appear on the bedding planes as black films. In Canberra, the Acton Shale appears in several outcrops in Acton, in two bands through Aranda, through Bruce near the Calvary Hospital, on the Bruce Ridge behind Lyneham. Also another band starts under the University of Canberra in Belconnen, and heads north east through Lawson and Giralang and folded and faulted into several bands in Crace on Gungahlin Hill. Another band is found on the west side of Queanbeyan, extending north to Dundee, and south around the east side of Jerrabomberra Hill. Acton shale is only preserved in the cores of synclines, being eroded from uplifted parts. Brachiopods, conodonts and sponges fossils are rarely found. The beds are up to 60 metres thick and appear high in the Pittman Formation. The age range is Gisbornian to Bolindian of the Ordovician period. Lower beds contains fossils like Dicranograptus nicholsoni. Upper beds contain Climacograptus bicornbis, Chastatus, C tubuliferis, Dicellograptus elegans, and Dicranograptus hians which are late Eastonian in age.

The sediments making the Acton Shale were deposited in the ocean in a reducing environment starved of oxygen, and lacking fresh sediment.

=== Late Early Silurian ===
State Circle Shale

The State Circle Shale was named by Öpik in 1958. It is named after the street where it was described. Its age is Llandoverian. Its lithology is shale, mudstone, siltstone and minor sandstone. In the type location there is about 60 metres of non-calcareous sandy shale and dark grey shale with beds of fine-grained sandstone. Between Kings Avenue and Commonwealth Avenue, there is a good outcrop on State Circle, consisting of buff-coloured laminated siltstone and shale with fine sandstone beds contorted by slumping. Its top is an unconformity, with Camp Hill Sandstone lying on top. There is probably up to 200 metres thickness of this shale. The shale was deposited in the deep sea as turbidites. It can be found in Yarralumla, Parkes, Acton, north and south of Black Mountain, and from Lawson, to Crace and Ngunnawal.

Black Mountain Sandstone

Black Mountain Sandstone is deposited on top of State Circle Shale conformably. It is made up from thick beds of grey quartz sandstone mostly, but has some beds included of siltstone and grey shale. The grain size is fine to medium. It was originally named by Öpik after the mountain—Black Mountain where it is found. Originally it was believed to be Ordovician, but is actually from the Silurian period, late Llandoverian epoch. Some of the slopes of Black mountain are covered in fanglomerate. The deposition was in a marine proximal turbidite fan, with the turbidity current flowing to the east. There are no fossils, but there is some sedimentary structure including plane, cross or convolute laminations, load casts, slump units and flute moulds.

Tidbinbilla Quartzite

Tidbinbilla Quartzite has been modified by granite intrusions close by. It consists of medium grained sandstone, partly silicified and changed to quartzite. Belts of silstone and sandstone are included becoming more frequent at the top. The exposure is 300 metres thick. Low down there is a 2-metre thick bed of ashstone across a broad area that can be used as a marker bed.

=== Late Middle Silurian ===
Canberra Formation

In the 1840s fossils of brachiopods and trilobites from the Silurian period were discovered at Woolshed Creek near Duntroon. At the time these were the oldest fossils discovered in Australia, though this record has now been far surpassed. These fossils were from the Canberra Formation. In the past these rocks were known as the Canberra Group with components of Turner Shale, Riverside Formation, and City Hill Shale.

Canberra Formation can be found in the east part of South Canberra in Fyshwick, Kingston, Barton and Parkes. It is also found through North Canberra, excluding Campbell and Russell. It occurs through most of Gungahlin apart from Crace and Nicholls. The beds extend north in a wide band to 35 deg 03S near Bald Hill.

Narrabundah Ashstone is a member of the Canberra formation and is found is eastern Narrabundah and in a geological monument along Fairbairn avenue. Ashstone is a fine grained tuff. In addition to the ashstone the Canberra Formation has layers of green-grey to reddish dacite, also tuff, quartz andesite, but mostly it is calcareous shale, limestone or sandstone. Much is deeply weathered, which has posed difficulties for building foundations.

Walker Volcanics

Walker Volcanics appear as purple or greenish-grey dacitic ignimbrite. These volcanics contain chloritised cordierite and some have garnet. They are Wenlock age. They occur in southern Belconnen including Macquarie, Weetangera, Hawker, Page, Scullin, Higgins, Holt and the Pinnacle.

Hawkins Volcanics

Hawkins Volcanics is a green-grey dacite or dacitic tuff. These volcanics contain chloritised cordierite, and some have garnet. Their age is Ludlow to Wenlock. The volcanics occur in northern Belconnen, in Dunlop, Fraser, Spence, Mount Rogers, Flynn, Melba and Hall. Maximum thickness is 1770 m.

Ainslie Volcanics

Ainslie Volcanics oxide & element chemistry
order	oxide	% or ppm
1	SiO_{2}	66.8%
2	Al_{2}O_{3}	14.28%
3	FeO	3.42%
	Fe_{2}O_{3}	0.79%
4	K_{2}O	3.8%
5	CaO	2.61%
6	H_{2}O	2.5%
7	MgO	2.15%
8	Na_{2}O	2.05%
9	TiO_{2}	0.59%

Named after Mount Ainslie, Australian Capital Territory where their type location occurs, the Ainslie Volcanics are composed of Dacitic ignimbrite and minor volcaniclastic and argillaceous sediments. The lithology is bluish grey dacitic tuff, which can be massive or foliated, also dacitic agglomerate and shale. These volcanics contain chloritised cordierite and some have red almandine garnet. Jasper is found on low hills on the north side of the Molonglo River. The thickness is at least 700 metres. The magma was formed by melting an aluminium-rich pelitic sediment. The eruption came from a volcano into shallow sea water. The deposits built above sea level as they progressed. The underlying sediments now make up the Canberra Formation. Between Hall and Nanima Hill on Spring Range, the Mount Painter Volcanics lie unconformably on top. These rocks date from the Late Wenlockian epoch of the Silurian period. They were formed about the same time as the Walker Volcanics and Paddys River Volcanics.

The Ainslie Volcanics occur on Mount Ainslie, Mount Majura, and in a band extending from Bonshaw and Harman north to the east of Woolshed Creek, through Majura and at least to Gooroo Hill and Old Joe on the NSW border. On Mount Ainslie the sequence starts with dacitic tuff, banded dacitic tuff, massive dacitic tuff, fifty metres of agglomeratic tuff, massive dacitic tuff, fifty metres of ashstone and topped with massive dacitic tuff. The rocks on top of the eastern ridge is altered.

Mount Painter Volcanics

This was named after Mount Painter in Canberra by Öpik, who called it a porphyry. The description is a massive dark bluish-grey dacitic crystal tuff containing garnet and chloritised cordierite. There is a local appearance of agglomerate and pumice. There are prominent quartz and feldspar phenocrysts.

Xenoliths include jasperised sediments and there are some beds of tuffaceous siltstone and sandstone. It was mostly deposited from the air without water.

Mount Painter Volcanics overlie the Walker Volcanics unconformably. The top is also an unconformity with Yarralumla Formation and Deakin Volcanics and Yass Formation. The age is of Late Wenlock epoch or early Late Silurian. These rocks form a belt from Coppins Crossing towards Narrabundah and Jerrabomberra Creek.

Yarralumla Formation

In an intervening phase in volcanism predominantly sediments were deposited. Yarralumla Formation was named after the suburb of Yarralumla by Öpik in 1958. It consists mainly of mudstone which may be cemented by lime, or originally derived from tuff. There are some beds inserted of quartz sandstone or limestone. The bottom of the formation is on top of the Mount Painter Volcanics. The top of the formation grades up into pyroclastics from the Deakin Volcanics.

Deposition occurred in a shallow marine environment with a delta. The sea level was relative higher during this depositional phase compared with the earlier and later subaerial volcanic deposit periods. Its age is early Ludlow. This has been determined by shelly marine fossils, and a tonalite intrusion southwest of Red Hill with age determined as 417±8 Mya. Outcrops occur on Red Hill (the hill) and throughout Deakin, Australian Capital Territory and in southern Yarralumla, and also Hughes, Australian Capital Territory. The formation extends from Red Hill and Woden in the South to Yarralumla and Lake Burley Griffin in the north. The formation is evidence of the last major period when eastern Australia was still covered by shallow seas. It shows fossil evidence of trilobites, coral and primitive crinoids.

Another band stretches from Lyons, Australian Capital Territory north north west towards the Molonglo River. There may also be a patch in Symonston, Australian Capital Territory. Exposures can be seen at the Deakin Anticline—with pale brown siltstone; and also at the Yarralumla brickworks with olive-green calcareous mudstone.

Yass Subgroup

Dated early Ludlow to Wenlock. This may outcrop in Belconnen and Florey. The composition is calcareous and tuffaceous shale, sandstone, ashstone and limestone. These volcanics lack cordierite or garnet.

Deakin Volcanics

Deakin Volcanics chemistry
order	oxide	% or ppm
1	SiO_{2}	72.99%
2	Al_{2}O_{3}	13.33%
3	K_{2}O	3.78%
4	H_{2}O	2.98%
5	CaO	1.73%
6	FeO	0.9%
	Fe_{2}O_{3}	0.53%
7	CO_{2}	1.6%
8	Na_{2}O	1.12%
9	MgO	0.49%
10	TiO_{2}	0.22%
11	P_{2}O_{5}	0.06%
12	Ba	540 ppm
13	MnO	0.03%
14	Rb	210 ppm
15	Zr	125 ppm
16	Sr	100 ppm

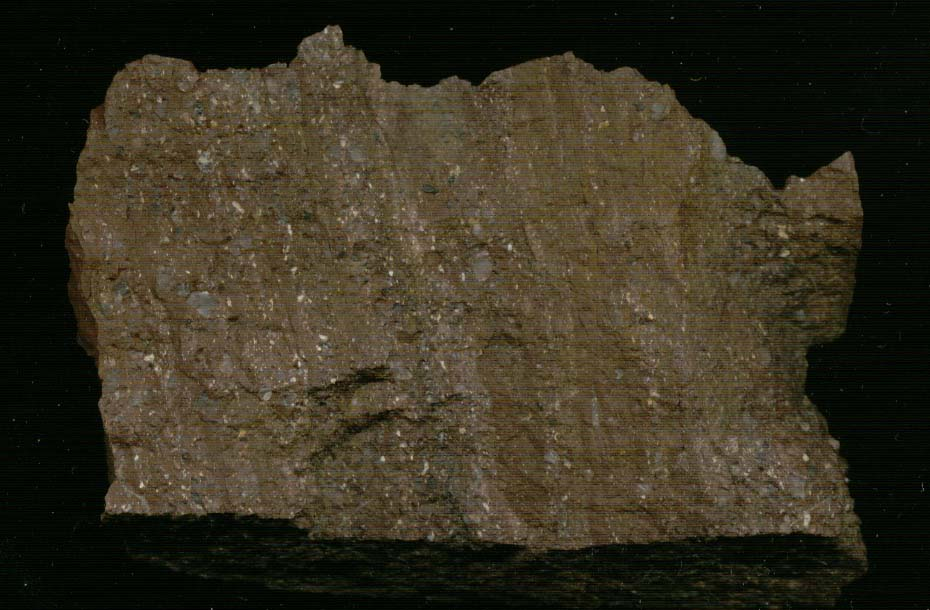
Banded Tuff from the Deakin Volcanics

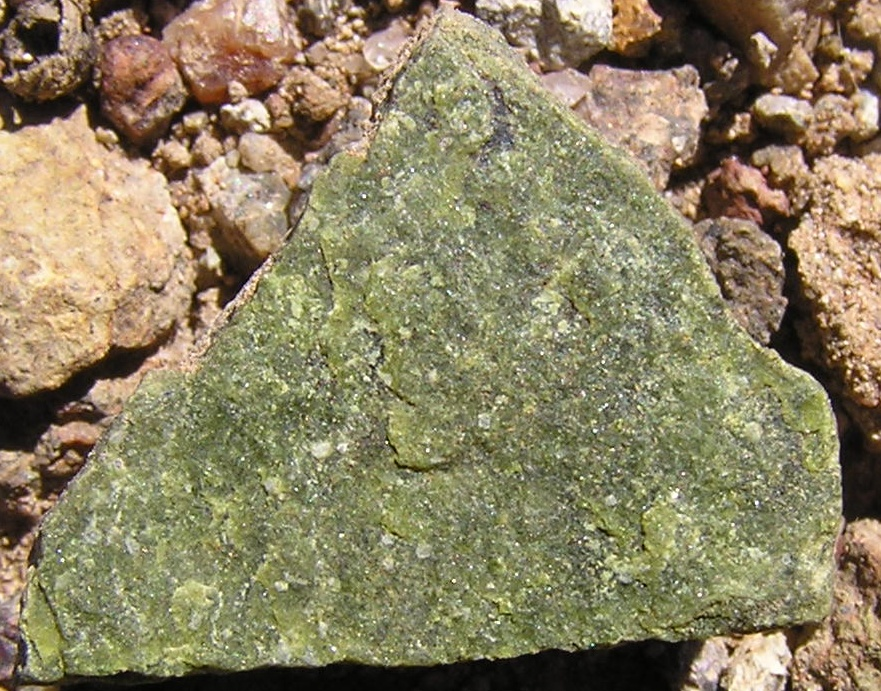
Deakin Volcanics rhyodacite modified to green colour

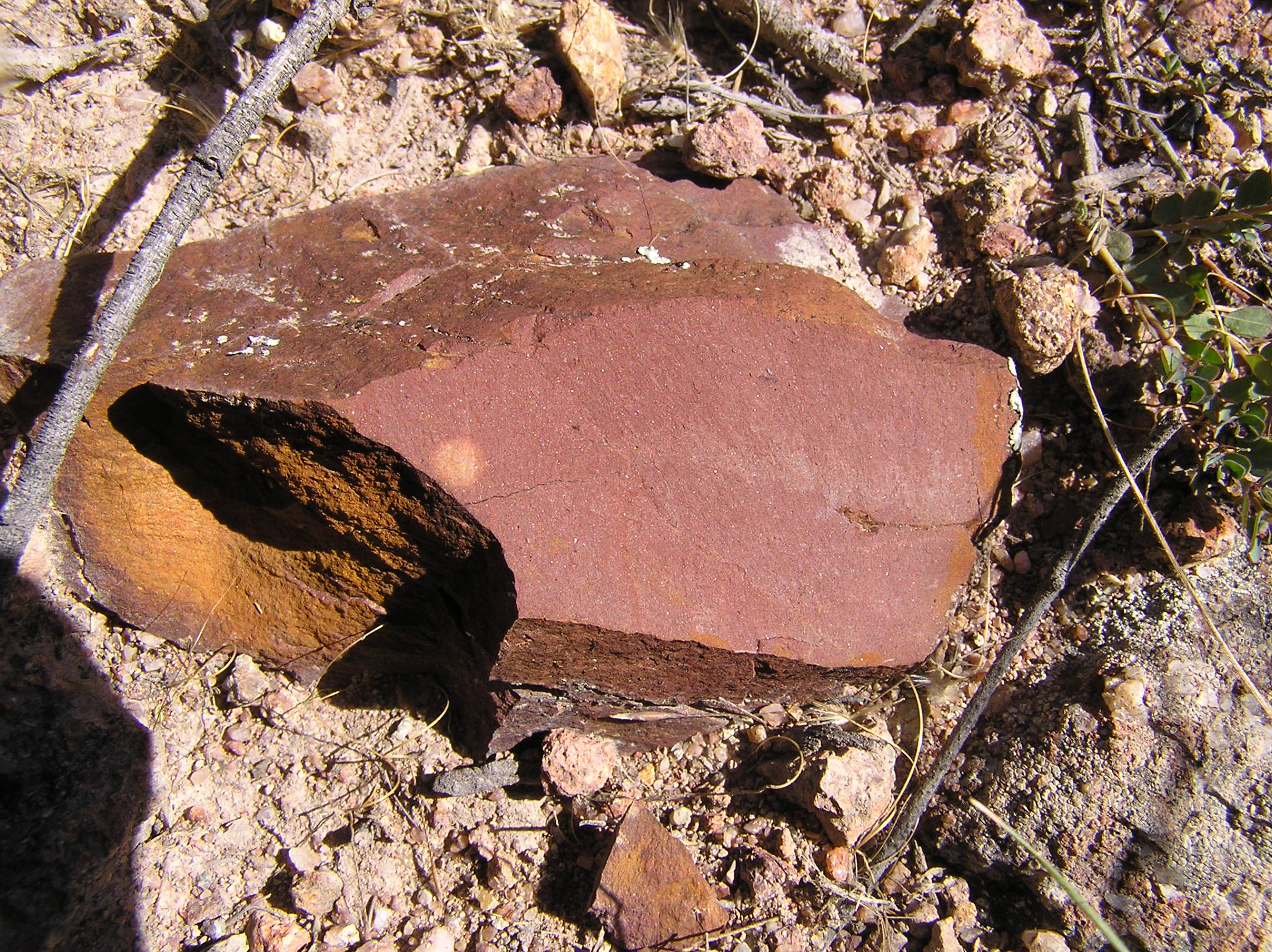
Deakin Volcanics red tuff

The Deakin Volcanics can be seen in the road cutting along the Tuggeranong Parkway between Hindmarsh Drive and Cotter Road. The visible base shows a weathered repeating sequence of interbedded rhyodacitic ignimbrite, sandstone, siltstone and red and yellow shale. Southwards the section passes up into a massive and partly banded rhyodacitic ignimbrite. The bottom of the Deakin Volcanics is exposed on nearby Heysen Street. At least 400m thickness of beds are exposed in the Parkway cutting. The Tuggeranong area has the thickest deposits. Rock types in the Deakin Volcanics are rhyodacitic ignimbrite, lava (Mugga Mugga Porphyry Member), tuff, tuffaceous shale and minor quartz sandstones and volcanic breccia-units show reddish brown alteration. The unit is of Early Ludlovian age. The rock on Mount Rob Roy and Pemberton Hill used to be known as Tuggeranong Granite, but is actually ignimbrite. The ignimbrite forms escarpments, with the lower-lying land being underlain by tuff. The Deakin Volcanics can be found south of the Deakin Fault between Belconnen and Charnwood and MacGregor. It also is found through Weston Creek north of Chapman and Fisher, through Woden apart from Curtin, and across to Hume, and south through Tuggeranong. The different colours found in the rocks are due to weathering, the red being from hematite, and the green from clay minerals such as celadonite. The pink crystals are potash feldspar.

The Mugga Mugga Porphyry is a lava flow. It is blue or mauve grey in a mass. The rock is veined with calcite, light green epidote, and deep red hematite. The phenocrysts are quartz, grey plagioclase, pink potash feldspar in lesser amounts and flakes of biotite. It is dated at 414±9 Mya. The Federal Golf Course Tonalite introduces some veins and saccharoidal galena.

Laidlaw Volcanics

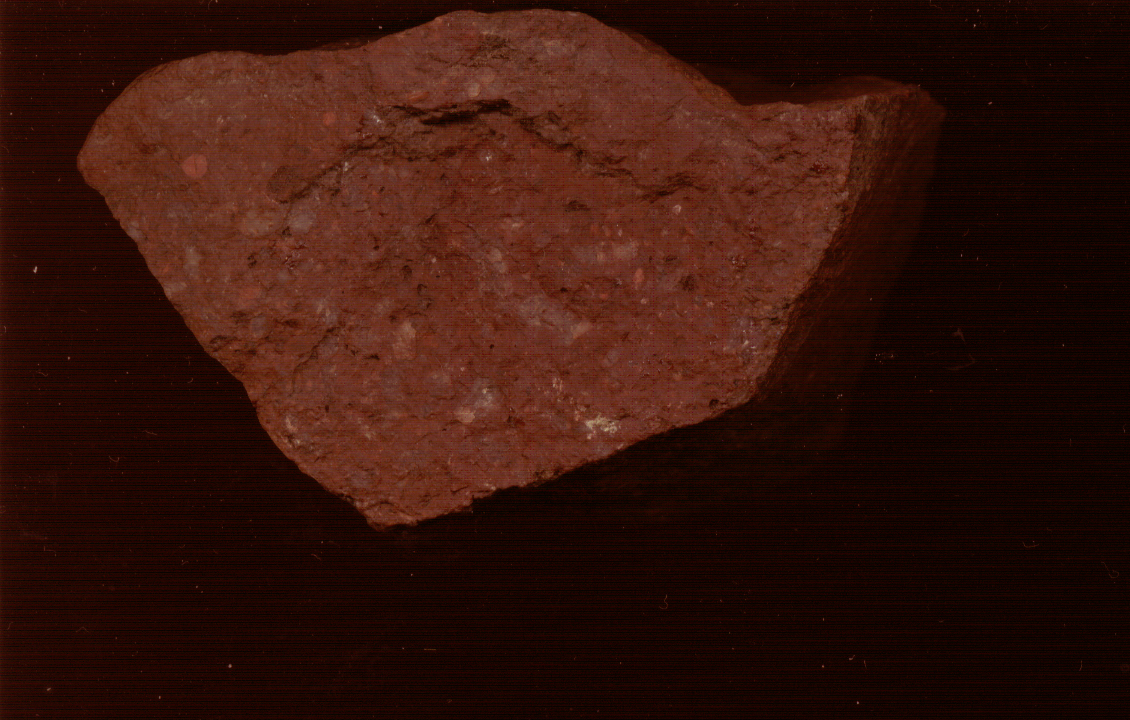
Ignimbrite from the Red Rocks Gorge has a strong red colour

The Laidlaw volcanics are a rhydacitic ignimbrite in the form of pale to dark grey rhyodacitic to dacitic crystal tuff. They are the top layer of Volcanics in the ACT. The Laidlaw Volcanics occur in a band along the Murrumbidgee River to the south west of Canberra, and also north west of Belconnen. They exist in the suburbs of Latham, Chapman, Kambah, and Greenway. The volcanics are of Ludlovian age 420.7±2.2 m.y. and have been used to set an absolute date for the Ludlow epoch. They are up to 850 metres thick.

Some shale and water deposited tuff occur to the west of Pine Island and Point Hut Crossing. North west of Mount Stromlo, on Uriarra Road, there is an occurrence of limestone over a few square kilometres.

Porphyrys

Porphyrytic intrusions occur throughout the area.

Middle Silurian intrusions could be volcanic necks. A coarse green grey rhyodacitic intrusive outcrops over one square kilometre west of Holt in the Walker Volcanic sediments. It is likely to be the magma chamber for the uppermost eruption of Walker Volcanics.

A coarse green grey rhyodacitic intrusive with white prominent feldspar crystals appears between the arms of Lake Ginninderra, McKellar, Evatt, Nine Elms, east Spence, and Nichols. This covers a few square kilometres. A small outcrop of the same material occurs in Cook and Jamison Center. This rock matches the upper layer of the Hawkins Volcanics.

East and north east of Watson is an intrusion of grey and cream dacite. This may correspond to the lower layer of the Ainslie Volcanics.

Late Silurian to early Devonian intrusions could also be volcanic necks. If so they have been responsible for the Laidlaw Volcanics. They are all unnamed. The first three intrude Laidlaw Volcanics.

A coarse rhyodacitic intrusive outcrops to the north west of Charnwood intrudes Laidlaw Volcanics, with about half a square kilometre of surface area.

A line of outcrops of coarse pink-brown rhyodacitic porphyry outcrops on the north side of Canberra on Forster Hill, MCquoids Hill and Neighbour Hill, and on East side of Mount Taylor.

A distorted band of coarse grey rhyodacitic porphyry occurs along the Murrumbidgee River from 1 to 4 kilometres south of Point Hut Crossing.

Another pink and green rhyolite porphyry occurs in Holder, Weston and Lyons. It intrudes Deakin Volcanics.

Glebe Farm Adamellite

A coarse porphyritic micro-adamellite was intruded sometime from late Silurian to early Devonian. It intrudes the Hawkins Volcanics in Belconnen in Flynn, Melba, McKellar, the Town Center and Bruce.

Sutton Granite

Also known as the Greenwood Granite, the Sutton Granite is a medium grained granite intruding the Pittman formation in the hills to the north east of Canberra Airport. The outcrop covers 4 square kilometres in the ACT. It was intruded during the late Silurian and is dated at 410+4Mya. The colour is pale grey with mineral white feldspar, milky grey quartz, black biotite, and with hornblende rich xenoliths. Minor minerals are apatite and zircon. The surrounding Pittman formation rocks have been metamorphosed in a contact aureole to hornfels and spotted schist. A magnetic high matches the location indicating the presence of magnetite.

Adaminaby Beds

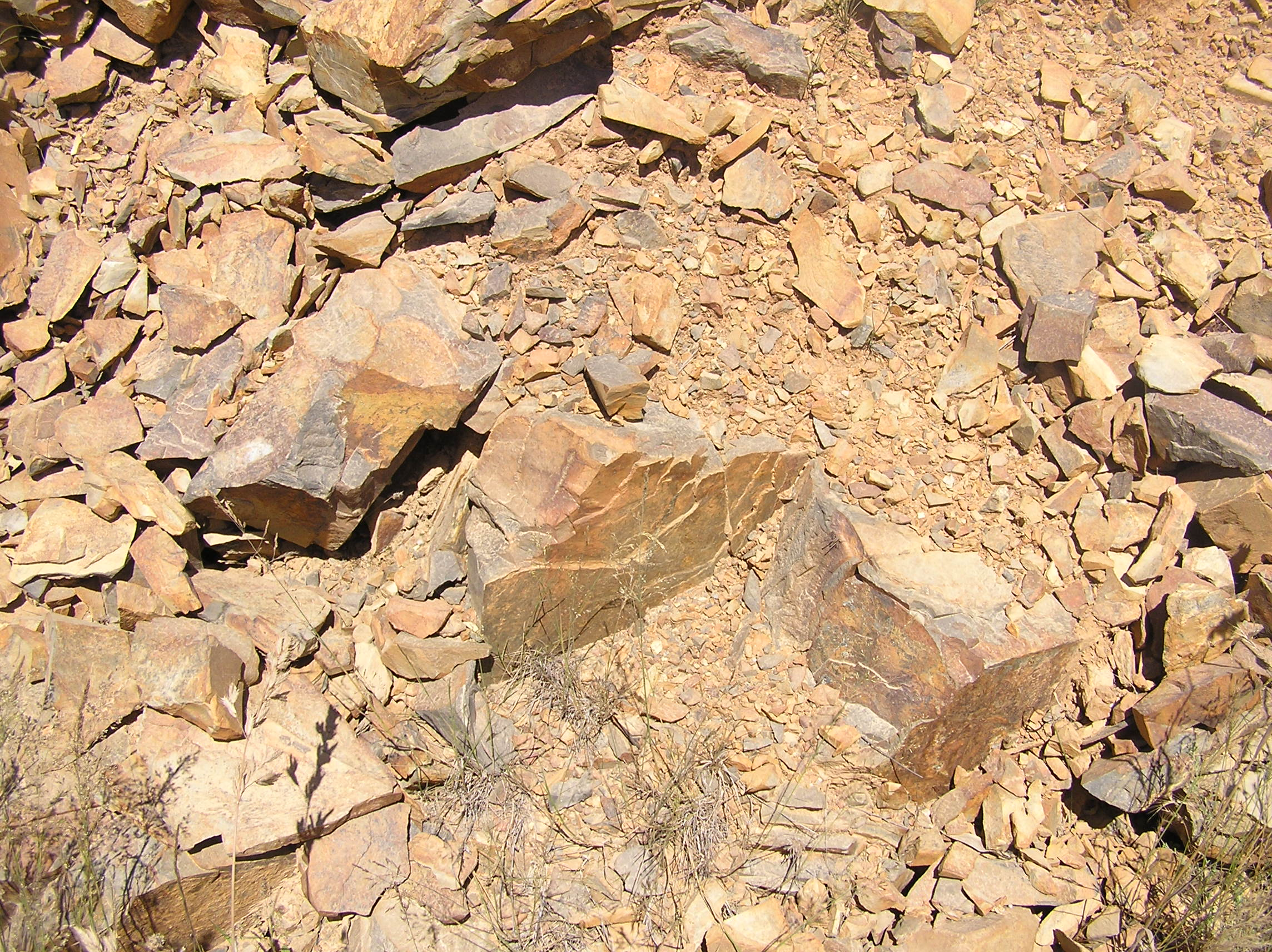
Adaminaby Beds outcrop south of the ACT

The Adaminaby Beds were formed from quartz turbidite capped with black shale. It consists mainly of fine to medium grained quartz rich sandstone and some mostly thin beds of siltstone, shale and slate. The sediments occur in a band on the west side of the ACT on Bulls Head, Mount Franklin, Mount Ginini and along the upper parts of the Cotter River. A separate outcrop extends into the ACT from the south in the area of the Gudgenby River. Yet another outcrop is on the Bullen Range.

Paddys River Volcanics

The Paddys River Volcanics consist of dacite and tuff with some shale phyllite and limestone. They occur to the west of the Bullen range, along the lower parts of the Paddys River. They were deposited on top of the Ordovician Adaminaby Beds, and intruded by Shannons Flat Adamellite.

Uriarra Volcanics

The Uriarra Volcanics consists of dacite lava flows and pyroclastic deposits of tuff. A fine ashstone bed called the Tarpaulin Creek Ashstone Member outcrops in an approximate north–south line and acts as a marker within the volcanics. Tuff and flows above and below the ashstone member contain obvious pink feldspar crystals. The tuff shows bedding, and the flows have banded flow structure. The Cotter Porphyry to the north of the Cotter Dam is actually a dacite flow. There is a limestone lens north of Uriarra Crossing. The outcrop goes from Mountain Creek Road in the west to the Murrumbidgee river in the east. It extends a few kilometres to the north of the ACT border and south to the Winslade Fault near the Cotter River. A wedge extends to the south south west, which includes Pierces Creek.

=== Late Silurian to Middle Devonian ===
Murrumbidgee Batholith

The Murrumbidgee Batholith formed by melting different sediments to the Ordovician Pittman Formations, as the granites contain more feldspar elements Ca, Na and K. At Cooma there is migmatite where the sediments have been partially melted in order to produce the plutonic rocks in the batholith. Variations in their composition are explained by partial mixing with melted oceanic crust. The batholith was largely crystallised before emplacement, and made space for intrusion by displacement rather than dissolution.

Clear Range Granodiorite

Clear Range Granodiorite Mineral Composition
Quartz	33.9%
Microcline K-feldspar	8.9%
Plagioclase	34.2%
Biotite	16.1%
Muscovite	1.8%

Clear Range Granodiorite covers 475 square kilometres from Tharwa to Thredbo on the west side of the Murrumbidgee batholith on Clear Range. Clear Range ridge forms the ACT border in the south east. Described as foliated with numerous inclusions. The inclusions are metamorphosed sediments and are common in biotite. It contains quartz and microcline feldspar and brown biotite and also muscovite. It has more biotite and plagioclase than Shannons Flat Granodiorite. The muscovite is distinctly foliated and there is also blue quartz. Texture is fine to medium grained. Close to the Murrumbidgee Fault the texture is mylonitic and the rock is easily weathered.

Shannons Flat Granodiorite

Shannons Flat Granodiorite is poor in xenoliths and is coarse grained. It was intruded after the clear Range Granodiorite.

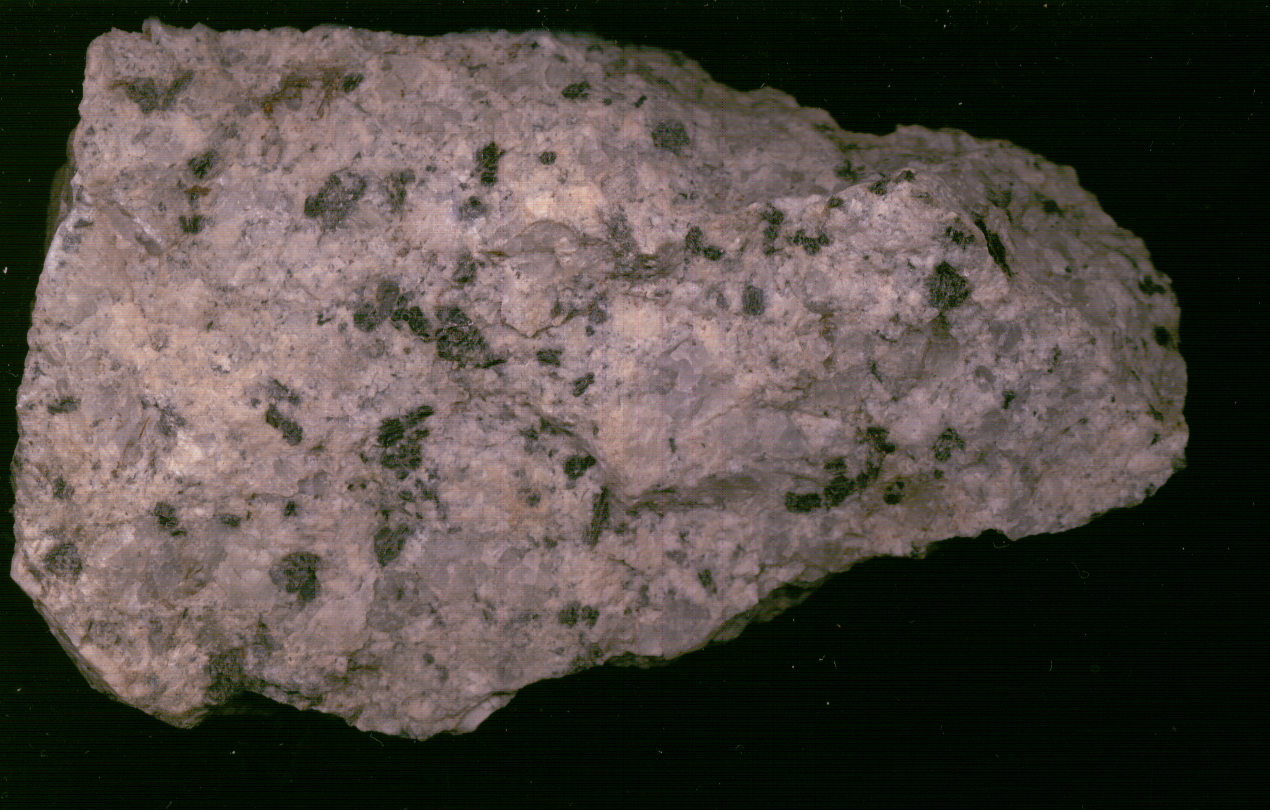
Shannons Flat Granodiorite from the Tidbinbilla Tracking Station

Shannons Flat Granodiorite Mineral Composition
Quartz	36.0%
Microcline K-feldspar	21.0%
Plagioclase	34.7%
Biotite	8.3%

Tharwa Adamellite Mineral Composition
Quartz	34.1%
Microcline K-feldspar	29.7%
Plagioclase	29.1%
Biotite	7.1%

Tharwa Adamellite

The Tharwa Adamellite resembles Shannons Flat Adamellite, but with more strongly zoned plagioclase (An50-20) contains microcline, it is poor in xenoliths and is coarse grained.

Booroomba Leucogranite

Booroomba Leucogranite is found at Mount Tennant and Booroomba Rocks. The total outcrop is 52 square kilometres. It is coarsely crystalline and pale in comparison to other granites. Muscovite occurs in unweathered rock. This leucogranite intrudes Clear Range Granodiorite and Shannons Flat Granodiorite.

It is low in iron and calcium, and higher in potassium than other Murrumbidgee Batholith intrusions.

Olivine Teschenite from Red Rocks Gorge

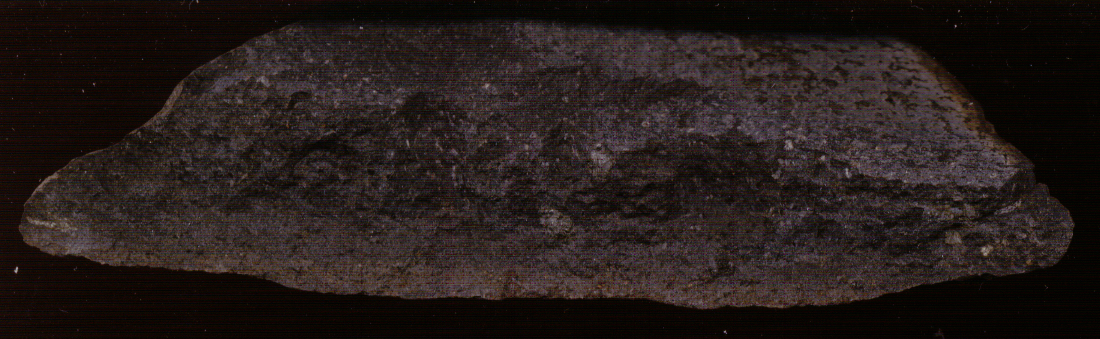
Black teschenite from the Red Rocks Gorge

A dyke of teschenite occurs in the Red Rocks Gorge near Allens Creek. It is oriented northwest–southeast and heads towards Kambah Pool Area. A similar dyke also outcrops on the west side of the Murrumbidgee River near Pine Island. The dyke is less than 0.5 metres thick. The rock is black, showing up well against the reds and browns of the Laidlaw Volcanics.

The rock consists of microphenocrysts of olivine altered to serpentine, pinkish brown titanaugite, brown kaersutite amphibole, and about 15% magnetite, embedded in a colourless analcime groundmass. Kaersutite contains titanium and has a formula near NaCa_{2}(Mg_{4}Ti)[Si_{6}Al_{2}O_{22}]O(OH).

The dyke is believed to be Tertiary in age.

== Geophysics ==
=== Seismic waves ===
In the ACT the Moho depth is about 46–47 km below sea level. South south east of Canberra to the Tasman Sea is a region of lower Moho depth than the surrounding south-east Australia. Seismic P-waves travel at 8.1 km/s in the mantle below this boundary. Above the Moho is an underplated layer with P-wave speeds of 6.7 to 7.0 km/s between 22 and 47 km. Above this layer is rock with speeds of 6.4 to 6.6 km/s from 22 to 15 km deep probably made from basic igneous rocks that were once oceanic crust. Above 15 km depth the P-wave speed is from 6 to 6.2 km/s and likely to be Ordovician turbidites as seen at the surface.

=== Magnetic field ===
Magnetic deviation through the centre of Canberra was measured at 12.00 degrees east in 1985. The contours run North east. Each year it shifts 2.2 minutes to the east. Magnetic field in all three components is measured continuously at a station in Canberra and made available online.

Magnetic Field Components at Civic at the end of 2013:

Magnetic declination D = 12.273° 
field strength F = 58096 nT
Magnetic inclination I = -65.856° 
dD = -0.008 deg/yr
dF = -28 nT/yr
dI = 0.014 deg/yr

=== Gravity field ===
The gravity anomaly over the ACT has been measured and published on the 1:100000 Canberra Geological Map. High level points in the gravity field occur at the head of Yass River just north of the east finger of the ACT of –320 μm·s^{−2}. 1 μm·s^{−2} is 0.1 milligals, so this level is –32 milligals. Another high of –330 μm·s^{−2} is just north of the northernmost point of the ACT. The contours in the ACT run NW–SE. At the Canberra GPO is about −440, at Scriviner Dam −510, at Lake Tuggeranong Dam −600, and Banks −590. The western end of Kambah has the lowest level in Canberra at −610. Oaks Estate is −400, the highest levels in the metropolitan area are at Watson and Mitchell at −350, and at Mulligans Flat at −345. This means that a 50 kg person, if measured on a force scale rather than on a balance, would apparently weigh 1.3 grams more in Watson, than they would in western Kambah.

A sensitive gravity measuring station is positioned on Mount Stromlo. This can measure changes in the gravity field over time.

The gravity lows are due to the Murrumbidgee Batholith which is compose of lighter rocks.

=== Heat flow ===
Temperature gradients in the Canberra area vary from 20 to 30 °C/km. At Blundell's Cottage heat flow is 73 mWm^{−2} with a gradient of 27 °C/km.

=== Movement ===
The ACT is moving 24 degrees east of north with a velocity of 54.5 mm/yr along with the rest of the Australian Plate. It is sinking at a rate of 3.5 mm per year.

== Soil ==
Most soils in the ACT are Podzols. They have a duplex structure with red or brown clayey layer. Typical thicknesses are 2 metres.

== Bibliography ==
- Richardson, S. J. and Barron L., 1977 Michelago 1:100000 Geological, Sheet 8726, Geol Surv Sydney
- Richardson, S. J., 1976, Geology of the Michelago 1:100000, Sheet 8726
- Canberra 1:250000 Geological Sheet, SI 55–16, 1964
- Strusz, D. L., 1:250000 Geological Series-Explanatory Notes Canberra
- Packham, G. H., 1969, The Geology of New South Wales
- Henderson, G. A. M. and Matveev, G., Geology of Canberra, Queanbeyan and Environs 1:50000 1980. This was used to determine the rock types in each suburb.
- Henderson, G. A. M., Geology of Canberra, Queanbeyan and Environs Notes to Accompany the 1980 1:50000 Geological map.
