= Deakin, Australian Capital Territory =

Suburb of Canberra, Australia

Deakin
- Suburb
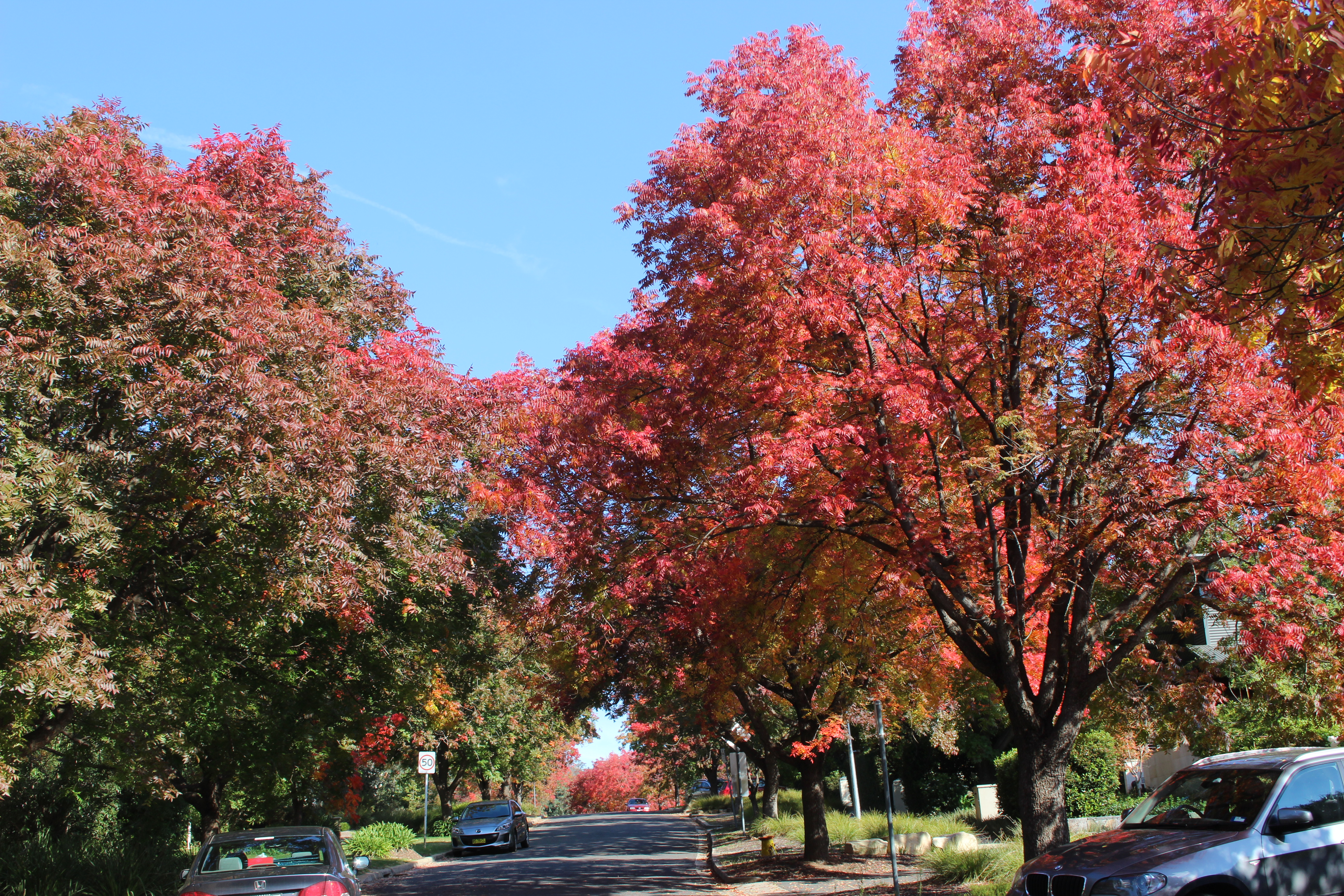
- Robe Street in autumn

- Coordinates: 35.316°S 149.107°E
- Country: Australia
- State: Australian Capital Territory
- City: Canberra
- District: South Canberra
- Location: 6 km (3.7 mi) SSW of Canberra CBD; 13 km (8.1 mi) W of Queanbeyan; 98 km (61 mi) SW of Goulburn; 295 km (183 mi) SW of Sydney
- Established: 1928

Government
  - Territory electorate: Murrumbidgee
  - Federal division: Canberra

Area
  - Total: 3.58 km^{2} (1.38 sq mi)
- Elevation: 593 m (1,946 ft)

Population
  - Total: 3,124 (2021 census)
  - Density: 872.6/km^{2} (2,260/sq mi)
- Postcode: 2600
- Gazetted: 20 September 1928
Suburbs around Deakin
Stromlo Forest	Yarralumla	Capital Hill
Curtin	Deakin	Forrest
Hughes	Garran	Red Hill

Deakin is a suburb of Canberra, Australian Capital Territory, Australia. Development began in the 1920s, although the vast majority of the suburb was built after 1945. It is a largely residential suburb. It includes The Lodge (the official residence of the Prime Minister) and the Royal Australian Mint.

== History ==
Deakin was gazetted in 1928 and is named after Alfred Deakin, second prime minister of Australia. Streets in Deakin are named after Governors, Governors-General and diplomats.

Deakin includes several items that are listed by the ACT Heritage Council:

- Canberra Girls' Grammar School Boarding House on Melbourne Avenue, which was the original school building with school rooms on the lower floor and boarders on the upper floor. Construction began on 8 May 1927 and was finished in 1928. It is a two-storey building with an attic room designed in the Interwar Tudor Revival style. The Heritage Council says it is significant as a "fine example of Interwar Old English style architecture and one of the very few in Canberra."
- 10 Gawler Crescent, a Post-War International style residence designed by Alex Jelinek in 1956.
- 70 Dominion Circuit, which is seen by the Heritage Council as demonstrating "a way of life that is no longer practised. The house and garage remain in original condition, demonstrating the character of a block and dwelling occupied by early middle to upper ranking Canberra public servants from the immediate pre to the immediate post World War 2 period."
- The Deakin Anticline (see Geology).

The Lodge and the Royal Australian Mint are listed on the Commonwealth Heritage List.

== Suburb amenities ==
A local shopping centre is located on Hopetoun Circuit and contains an IGA supermarket, service station, newsagent, chemist, and restaurants. The Deakin Health Spa, adjacent to the shops, has recently been taken over and rebadged as the local Fitness First facility. The Canberra Deakin Soccer Club is also located near by. The Embassy Hotel/Motel was also adjacent to the shops, but has since been demolished.

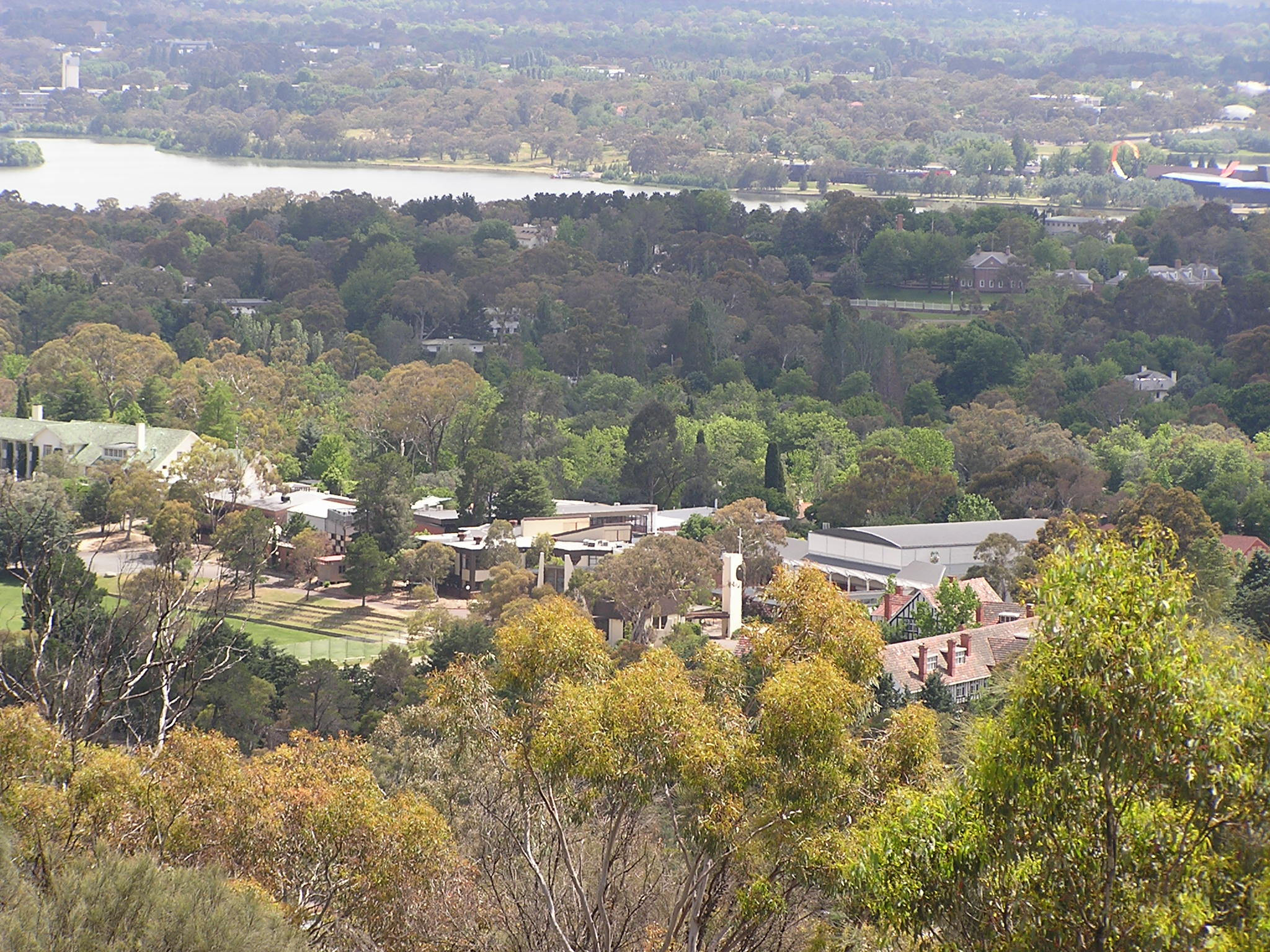
The suburb from Red Hill looking across the Girls' Grammar School to Yarralumla and Lake Burley Griffin

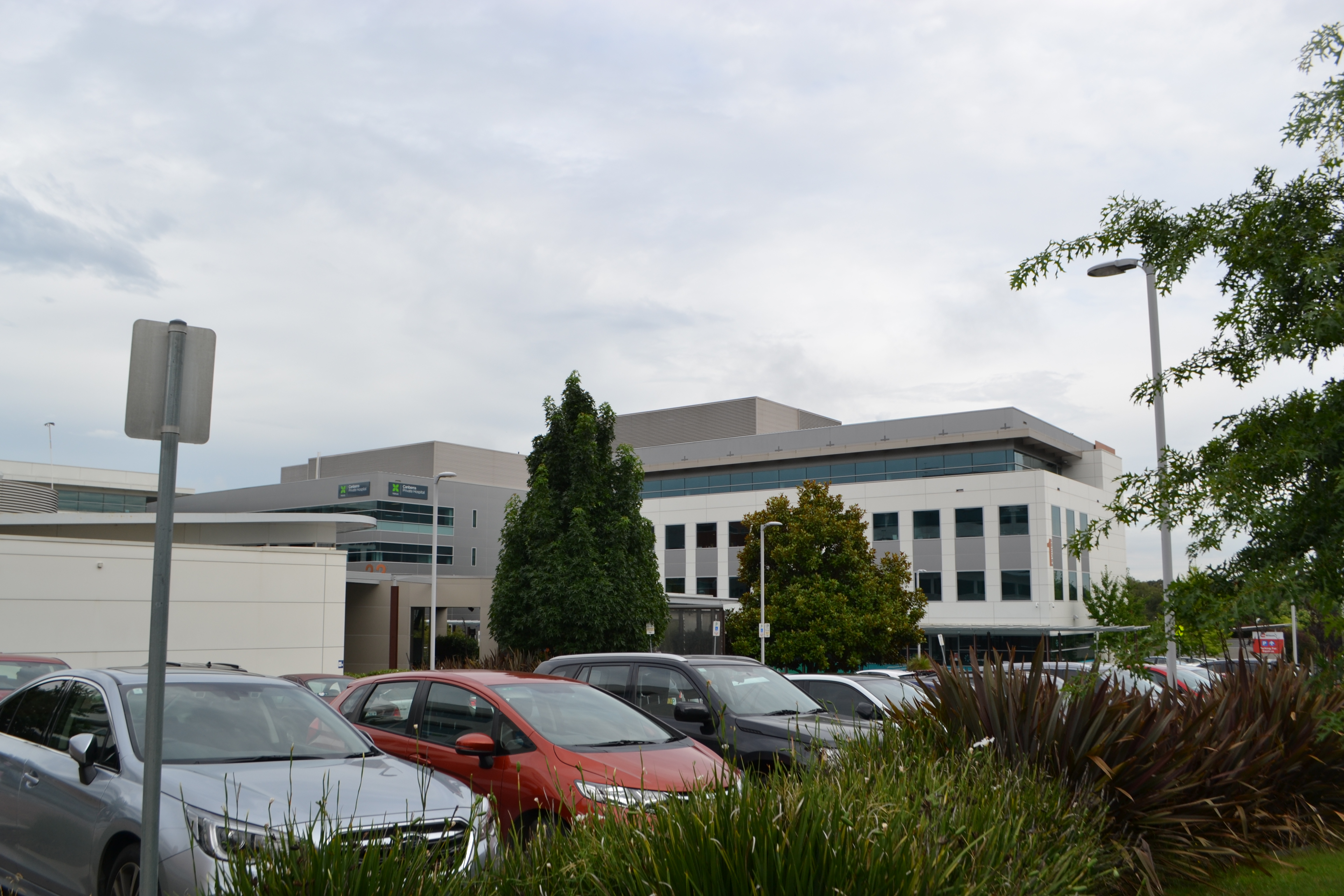
The Equinox area found in Deakin. Contains the EQ cafe, and various medical facilities and clinics.

== Education ==
Schools in the suburb of Deakin include Alfred Deakin High School (originally Deakin High), Canberra Girls' Grammar School and the erroneously named Woden School, which has always been situated within the South Canberra district of Canberra, not the Woden Valley district.

Deakin residents get preference for:

- Depending on the address: Forrest Primary or Yarralumla Primary
- Depending on the address: Deakin High School or Telopea Park School (for high school)
- Narrabundah College

The Canberra Japanese Supplementary School Inc., a Japanese weekend educational programme, holds its classes at Deakin High School, while it has its school office in Yarralumla. It was established on 1 August 1988.

== Notable places ==
=== Embassies ===
Deakin contains the embassies of Afghanistan, Bosnia, Hungary and Italy and the high commissions of Brunei, Cyprus, Fiji, Mauritius and Solomon Islands.

Embassies and High Commissions in Deakin
Afghanistan	Bosnia and Herzegovina	Brunei	Cambodia	Cyprus
Fiji	Hungary	Italy	Mauritius	Solomon Islands

=== The Lodge ===
Located on Adelaide Avenue, the Lodge is the official residence of the Prime Minister of Australia.

=== The Royal Australian Mint ===
Officially opened by Prince Philip, Duke of Edinburgh on 22 February 1965, the Royal Australian Mint was commissioned to produce Australia's decimal coinage, which came into effect on 14 February 1966.

== Demographics ==
At the 2021 census, the population of Deakin was 3,124; 1.3% were Indigenous, 69.3% were born in Australia and 5.1% were born in England. 78.4% of people only spoke English at home. 67.9% of dwellings were separate houses (compared to the Australian average of 72.3%), 18.0% were semi-detached, row or terrace houses (Australian average: 12.8%) and 13.9% were flats, units or apartments (Australian average: 14.2%). 43.8% of the population were professionals, compared to the Australian average of 24.0%. The most common responses for religion were No Religion 41.7%, Catholic 19.9% and Anglican 13.4%.

== Governance ==
2025 federal election
Labor	42.80%
Liberal	35.39%
Independent	10.97%
Greens	7.68%

Deakin is located within the federal electorate of Canberra, which is currently represented by Alicia Payne in the House of Representatives. In the ACT Legislative Assembly, Deakin is part of the electorate of Murrumbidgee, which elects five members on the basis of proportional representation; as of 2020, the members are two Labor, two Liberal and one Greens. Polling place statistics are shown to the right for the Deakin polling place at Canberra Girls' Grammar School Junior School in the 2025 federal election.

== Geology ==
The west of the suburb exposes Yarralumla Formation calcareous shale, sandstone, tuff and hornfels. The east of the suburb exposes Mount Painter Volcanics dark grey to green grey dacitic crystal tuff and agglomerate. A patch of cream rhyolite, tuff and ashstone is found in the mid east near Empire Circuit.

The Deakin Fault does not actually pass through Deakin. The Deakin Fault is a major fault in Canberra running North-west to south-east passing through state circle very close to Deakin. It extends from the hills to the east of Jerrabomberra via Narrabundah, Griffith, Forest, Yarralumla, then across the Molonglo River to Cook, then turns north east in Macquarie where it turns around to the north west again via Belconnen, Evatt, Melba, Flynn, Charnwood, Dunlop and out the north west of the ACT. It continues to the east end of Lake Burrunjuck near Yass. The block on the north east side was elevated and the south west side lowered.

The Deakin Anticline is a geological monument located between the Deakin Oval and the Grange Retirement Village. It is in the Yarralumla Formation in Tuffacious sandstone and siltstone. Access is from Hannah Place.
