= Mount Rogers (Australian Capital Territory) =

Hill in Australian Capital Territory

- Location within Australian Capital Territory

Highest point
- Elevation: 704 m (2,310 ft)
- Coordinates: 35°11′S 149°03′E

Geography
- Location: Australian Capital Territory, Australia

Mount Rogers is a large hill, with an elevation of 704 metres (2,310 ft), located in the northern suburbs of Canberra, within the Australian Capital Territory, Australia. There is a park called the Mount Rogers Reserve at the crest of the hill, and a trig point at the summit.

== Location and features ==
The suburbs of Flynn, Melba, Spence and Fraser are situated on its slopes.

Mount Rogers has several significant rocky outcrops around the area which are predominantly made up of dacite, indicating the area's volcanic past. Small boulders are also common and the soil is generally rocky and thin. The area contain approximately 50 two-hundred-year-old eucalypts. The stumps of even larger older trees indicate that, prior to European settlement, the landscape would have been an open grassy woodland. Many new trees and shrubs were planted in the early 1970s as the suburbs' houses were built around the rather treeless hill.

Mount Rogers has a popular walking track, approximately 2.5 km (1.6 mi) in length, around its perimeter which offers views of Lake Ginninderra, the Brindabellas, and Hall. Regular walkers and other locals care about this 64-hectare (160-acre) (approx.) piece of land and its bird, reptile, plant and mammal species, and this interest has promoted community spirit and monthly working bees. The area has a Landcare group, Mt Rogers Landcare, which has a blog where the groups' coordinator's newsletters are posted periodically.

Superb Parrots and Tawny Frogmouths have been regular (bird) visitors to Mt Rogers in recent years, as recorded on the blog and its pages.

Mt Rogers has been an off-lead dog space for forty years, making it a dog-walking destination for residents of the four suburbs bordering Mt Rogers. The off-lead area allows residents to walk their dogs freely and for them to socialise with other dogs and people.

== Etymology ==
Mount Rogers is named after John Core Rogers (c. 1898 – 1971), who was the Commonwealth Surveyor General from 1949 to 1963. He also served on the Canberra Building Review Committee, was foundation president of the Canberra Division of the Institute of Surveyors and was instrumental in the formation of the National Mapping Council in 1945.
