= Mount Rogers (disambiguation) =

Mount Rogers may refer to:

- Mount Rogers, highest point in Virginia, USA
- Mount Rogers (Antarctica)
- Mount Rogers (British Columbia) in British Columbia, Canada
- Mount Rogers (Washington) in Washington, USA
- Mount Rogers (Australian Capital Territory), a hill in the Australian Capital Territory
- Mount Rogers Health District, a health district composed of five counties in Southwest Virginia

== See also ==
- Rogers Peak, Oregon, USA
