= Flynn, Australian Capital Territory =

Flynn
- Suburb
- Coordinates: 35°12′9″S 149°3′1″E
- Country: Australia
- State: Australian Capital Territory
- City: Canberra
- District: Belconnen
- Established: gazetted on 9 September 1971

Government
  - Territory electorate: Ginninderra
  - Federal division: Fenner

Area
  - Total: 2.1 km^{2} (0.81 sq mi)

Population
  - Total: 3,671 (SAL 2021)
- Postcode: 2615
Suburbs around Flynn
Fraser	Fraser	Spence
Charnwood	Flynn	Melba
Latham	Latham	Florey

Flynn is a suburb in the Belconnen district of Canberra, located within the Australian Capital Territory, Australia.

The suburb is named after John Flynn, who was a Presbyterian minister and missionary who was mainly responsible for the formation of the Australian Inland Mission Aerial Medical service in 1928. Flynn was the forerunner of the Royal Flying Doctor Service in Australia. Streets in Flynn are named after workers in the flying doctor service, and the suburb name 'Flynn' was gazetted on 9 September 1971. Flynn is located between Tillyard Drive, Kingsford Smith Drive and Ginninderra Drive and is next to the suburbs of Charnwood, Fraser, Melba, Latham and Spence.

In 2011, the median house price for the suburb of Flynn was A$475,000.

== Schools ==
Flynn Primary School and Preschool are located in the centre of the suburb. Flynn Primary School and Preschool were opened in February 1974, and the primary school was closed in 2006 under the Government of the Australian Capital Territory's controversial mass school closures program. The preschool is still open. The school's community appealed the closure in the Supreme Court of the Australian Capital Territory, raising $50,000 demanded by the ACT Government as security of costs to proceed. Despite running for two years, the appeal was never heard in court. In March 2009, the appeal was dismissed by consent when the ACT Government threatened to apply for further costs.

Children living in Flynn attend schools in Neighbouring suburbs:

- Melba Copland Secondary School
- St Francis Xavier College (Canberra)
- Copland College
- St Thomas Aquinas Primary School
- Brindabella Christian College
- St Monica's Primary School, Evatt
- Fraser Primary school
- Latham Primary school
- Mt Rogers Primary school

== Heritage ==
Flynn Primary School and Preschool were one of only four school complexes designed by award-winning architect Enrico Taglietti, and is considered to be a good example of his dramatic application of twentieth century organic architecture. The Primary School was the first fully open-plan school in the ACT. The grounds also contain a National Memorial to the Royal Flying Doctors' Reverend John Flynn and a separate memorial to George Simpson. Taglietti called the school one of his most important works.

An application for heritage listing of the Flynn Primary School and grounds, Flynn Preschool and George Simpson Park was lodged in December 2007 by the John Flynn Community Group. The complex met the threshold for listing on the Australian Capital Territory Heritage Register, leading to a commitment from the ACT Government to retain the building and grounds and protect their heritage value. In early 2010, however, the ACT Heritage Council rejected the application. Two Flynn community groups and Taglietti joined to appeal this decision in the ACT Civil and Administrative Tribunal. On 18 February 2011, the Tribunal upheld the ACT Heritage Council's decision to not list Flynn Primary School. In December 2012, an appeal was lodged before the ACT Supreme Court.

== Governance ==
For the purposes of Australian federal elections for the House of Representatives, Flynn is in the Division of Fenner.

For the purposes of Australian Capital Territory elections for the ACT Legislative Assembly, Flynn is in the Ginninderra electorate.

== Geology ==
The southwest of Flynn is dominated by Deakin Volcanics purple rhyodacite. Grey rhyodacitic tuff forms a stipe of rocks in the south with green grey and purple rhyodacite in the south corner. The Deakin Fault passes in the north west direction separating the Deakin Volcanics on the south west from the Hawkins Volcanics on the north east side. The fault lowered on the south west. Hawkins Volcanics Green grey dacite and quartz andesite occur in the north of Flynn. This is intruded by a band of Glebe Farm Adamellite.
