= Latham, Australian Capital Territory =

Latham
- Suburb
- Coordinates: 35°13′02″S 149°01′53″E
- Country: Australia
- State: Australian Capital Territory
- City: Canberra
- District: Belconnen
- Location: 14 km (8.7 mi) NW of Canberra CBD; 32 km (20 mi) WNW of Queanbeyan; 98 km (61 mi) SW of Goulburn; 295 km (183 mi) SW of Sydney
- Established: 1971

Government
  - Territory electorate: Ginninderra
  - Federal division: Fenner

Area
  - Total: 2.7 km^{2} (1.0 sq mi)
- Elevation: 575 m (1,886 ft)

Population
  - Total: 3,767 (SAL 2021)
- Postcode: 2615
Suburbs around Latham
Charnwood	Flynn	Melba
Macgregor	Latham	Florey
Holt	Higgins	Scullin

Latham (/ˈleɪθəm/) is a residential suburb in the Belconnen district of Canberra, located within the Australian Capital Territory, Australia. The suburb is named for John Latham, Chief Justice of the High Court of Australia from 1935 to 1952. Streets in Latham have the names of Australian judges.

== Location and features ==
It is bounded by the suburbs of Charnwood, Flynn, Florey, Higgins, Holt and Macgregor. It is surrounded by Ginninderra Drive on the north, Florey Drive on the west, Southern Cross Drive on the south, and Kingsford Smith Drive on the east.

Latham has a primary school, a neighbourhood oval and a number of children's playgrounds. Ginninderra Creek runs through Latham, and there are open areas of grassland adjacent, such as the Umbagong district park. Traces of Aboriginal culture remain along the Creek with a marked site of axe-grinding grooves. Latham also has an ACTEWAGL/Evoenergy substation.

From the mid-1970s, Latham had a local shopping centre (supermarket, butcher, Chinese restaurant, chemist (later a school uniform/limited sportswear store), hair dresser, bakery, newsagent, doctor's surgery (later physiotherapist) and post office), and a petrol/service station (closed in early 1993).

The shopping centre wound down between 1996 and 1998 after a fire that destroyed the supermarket and caused roof damage to the rest of the centre. The schoolwear shop, which had occupied the old chemist shop, also took in the local post office function. After the fire, the owners moved the schoolwear and post office business to the vacant petrol station site. The post office shop was authorised to limited "corner store" duties from early 1998. The butcher, restaurant and physiotherapist left 12–18 months after the fire, with the restaurant the last to leave and the complex finally fenced off in May 1998. The complex no longer exists: a townhouse development now occupies the site. Planning was eventually approved after the developer responded to local pressure to include a small corner store at the edge of the complex, on the corner of Onslow Street and Dalley Crescent. The former petrol station site was later cleared and replaced by another townhouse development.

== Governance ==
For the purposes of Australian federal elections for the House of Representatives, Latham is in the Fenner electorate.

For the purposes of Australian Capital Territory elections for the ACT Legislative Assembly, Latham is in the Ginninderra electorate.

== Geology ==
Most of Latham is covered by the upper Silurian Deakin Volcanics. From the north east of Latham to the south west, the following stratigraphic layers of volcanics are passed:

- green grey and purple rhyodacite.
- grey rhyodacitic tuff
- purple rhyodacite
- purple and green tuff
- pink rhyolite
- purple-pink rhyolite

Upper Silurian Laidlaw Volcanics grey tuff form a wedge over the top of the Deakin Volcanics.
