= Booroomba Rocks =

Climbing area in Australia

Coordinates: 35.562°S 148.989°E

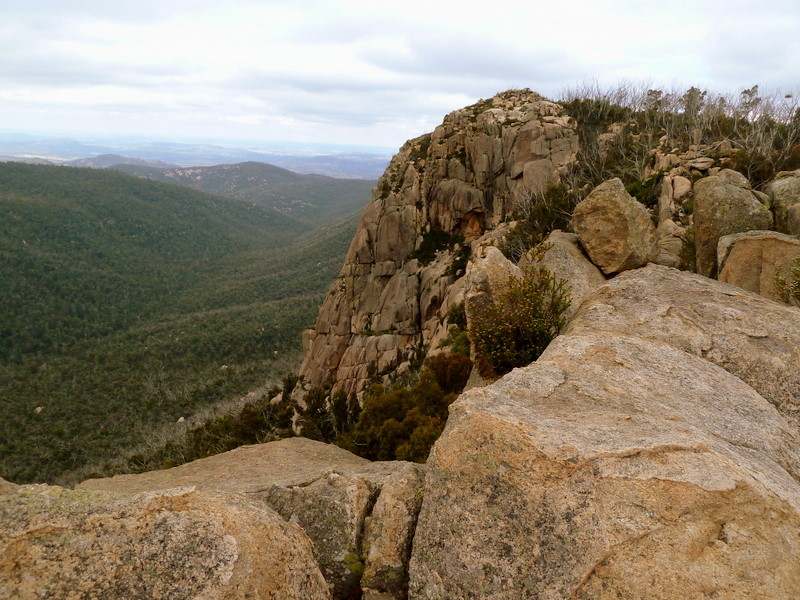
Viewing NE from the saddle of Booroomba Rocks as approached from Apollo Road and Honeysuckle Campsite

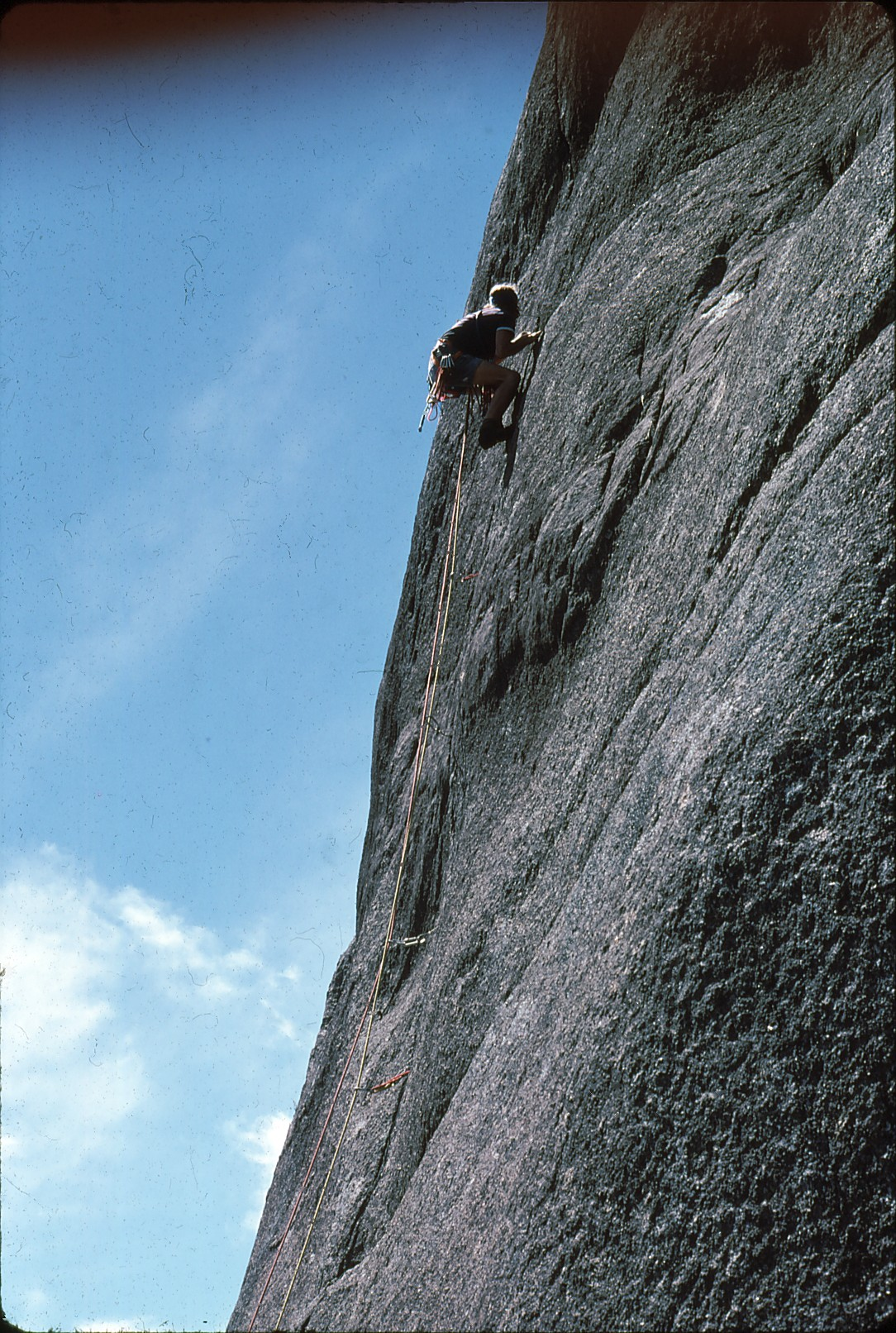
Peter Mills climbing Integral Crack at Booroomba Rocks in 1976

Booroomba Rocks is a granite area in Namadgi National Park, in the Australian Capital Territory, particularly noted for its slab climbing. The rocks are divided into several areas, the most prominent being North Buttress, Middle Rocks, and South Buttress.

It is also known for its botany.

The area was first approached from Booroomba Station. However, it was not until Honeysuckle Creek Tracking Station, and the associated Apollo Road were opened, that the area became feasible as a climbing area.

== See also ==
- Geology of the Australian Capital Territory
