= Charnwood, Australian Capital Territory =

Charnwood
- Suburb
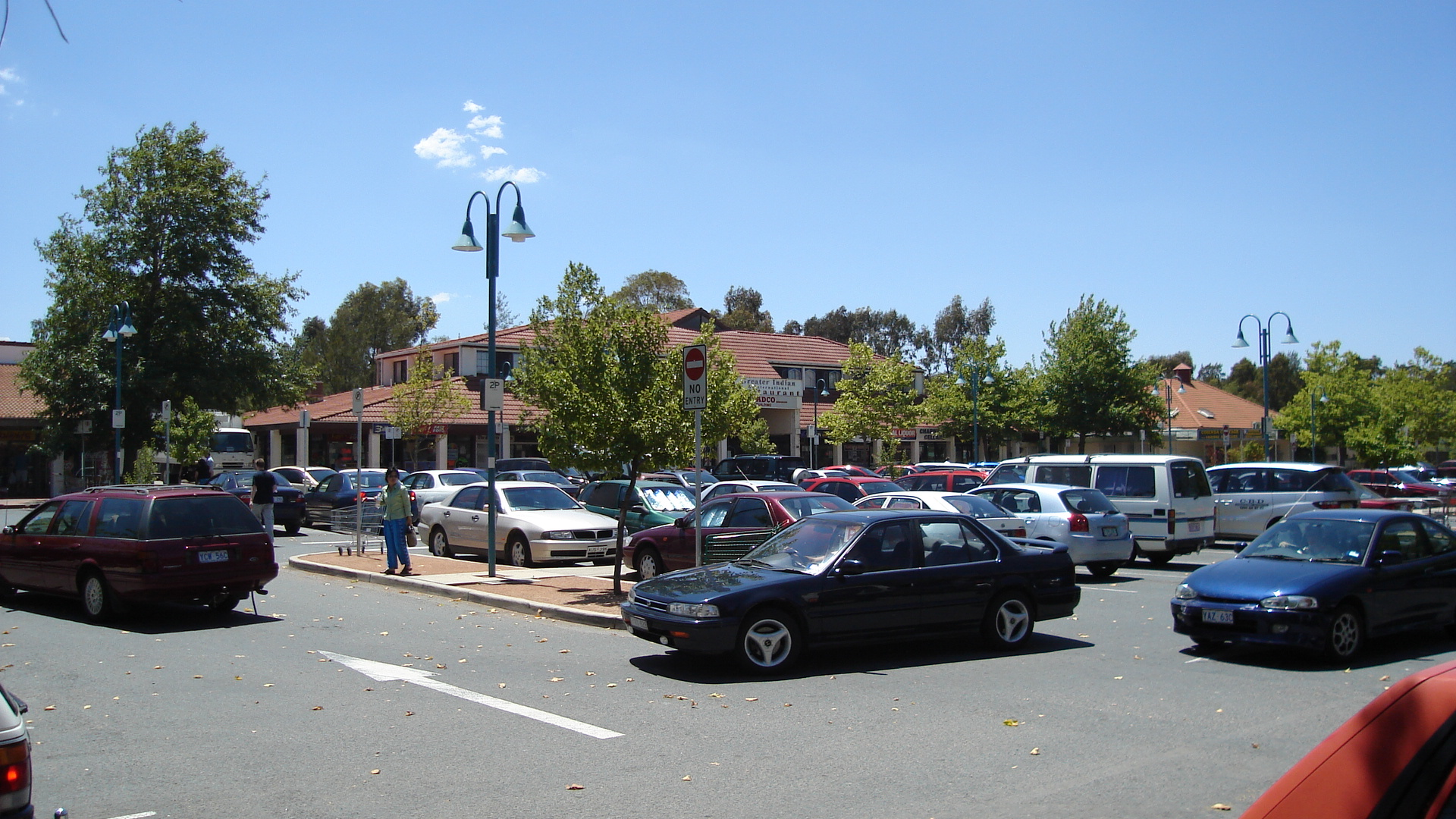
- Charnwood shopping centre

- Coordinates: 35°12′00″S 149°02′13″E
- Country: Australia
- State: Australian Capital Territory
- City: Canberra
- District: Belconnen
- Location: 16 km (9.9 mi) NW of Canberra CBD; 34 km (21 mi) WNW of Queanbeyan; 98 km (61 mi) SW of Goulburn; 295 km (183 mi) SW of Sydney
- Established: 1973

Government
  - Territory electorate: Ginninderra
  - Federal division: Fenner

Area
  - Total: 1.9 km^{2} (0.73 sq mi)
- Elevation: 573 m (1,880 ft)

Population
  - Total: 3,055 (SAL 2021)
- Postcode: 2615
Suburbs around Charnwood
Dunlop	Fraser	Fraser
Dunlop	Charnwood	Flynn
Macgregor	Latham	Flynn

Charnwood (/ˈtʃɑːrnwʊd/) is a suburb in the Belconnen district of Canberra located within the Australian Capital Territory, Australia.

Charnwood is bounded by Ginninderra Drive, Tillyard Drive, Kerrigan Street, Townson Crescent, Belconnen Netball Association courts and the Charnwood district playing fields.

== Design ==
Charnwood's estate design was based on the Radburn principle. Under this design, houses were to face common parkland, with the suburb's streets servicing garages situated at the rear of the houses. The design failed in its application, however, as home owners built fences around the "park side" of their blocks, effectively screening the houses away from the common parkland. This created long, narrow, fenced walkways, with poor lighting and no neighbourhood surveillance. The original design for the network of pathways was to make it possible to walk from any point in the suburb to any other without directly crossing a road; pedestrian bridges can be used to cross the few major streets within the suburb.

== Facilities ==
=== Shopping ===
Charnwood has multiple facilities, including the Charnwood centre shopping area, which serves some of the surrounding suburbs; the shopping centre includes several fast food outlets, cafe's, a laundromat, a branch of the Labor Club, an Australia Post LPO, a Reddy Express/Shell Service Station and a Woolworths.

=== Sporting ===
The Charnwood District Playing Fields are located in Charnwood on Lhotsky Street and are home to the Ginninderra "The Tigers" athletics club during the track season (October – March). Next to the playing fields is the Belconnen Netball Association Courts.

=== Education ===
Charnwood is home to Charnwood-Dunlop Primary School, Saint Thomas Aquinas Catholic Primary School, Saint Thomas Aquinas Catholic Church, and the Brindabella Christian College Charnwood Campus.

=== Other ===
The West Belconnen Ambulance Station and the West Belconnen Fire Station are located at shared facility incorporating ambulance, fire and rescue services was opened in October 2013 by the Minister for Police and Emergency Services, and is located near the Charnwood shops, adjacent to the service station, in-between Lhotsky Street and Ginninderra Drive.

== Naming ==
According to the Act Planning and Land Authority website, the suburb is named after: "[a] former homestead in the Belconnen District; Henry Hall obtained a grant of 3,492 acres (14.13 km^{2}) of land which he named 'Charnwood', 1833; named after the Forest of Charnwood in England."

Street names in Charnwood are named after New South Wales pioneers and the suburb name 'Charnwood' was gazetted on 9 September 1971.

== Interests ==
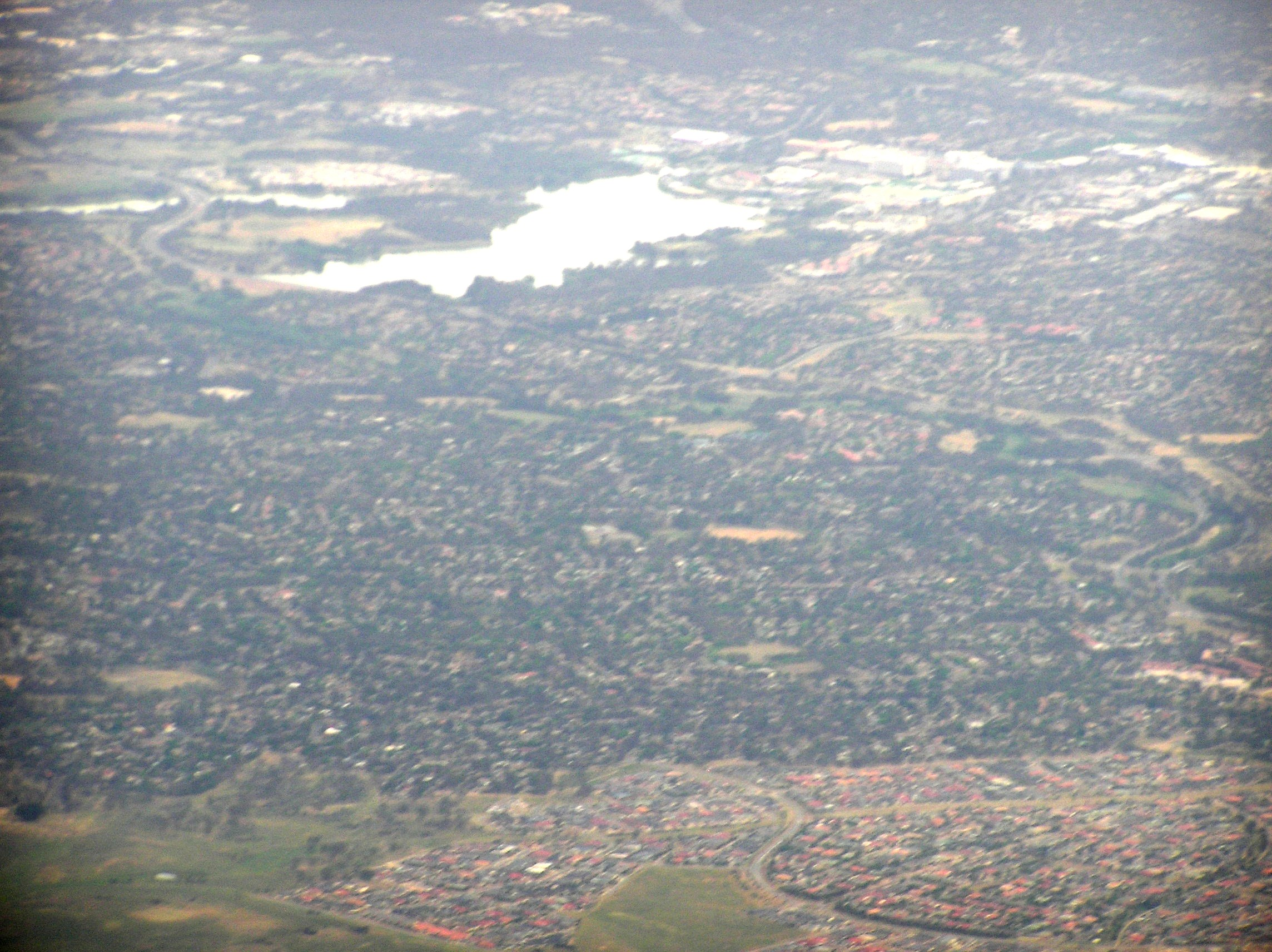
Charnwood is the treed area behind the bare Dunlop in this aerial picture looking to the southeast over Belconnen

From 2004 to 2018 there was an annual carnival call the 'Charny Carny', a unique event which benefited Saint Thomas Aquinas Catholic Primary School, Charnwood-Dunlop Primary School and Mount Rogers Scout Group. This carnival had the traditional purpose of building community spirit and donates funds for both the schools and the Scout Group.

On 4 March 2020 the West Belconnen Charny Carny Association Incorporated who run the Charny Carny announced that the carnival would no longer be running, due to not having enough volunteers on the committee to run the event.

== Governance ==
For the purposes of Australian federal elections for the House of Representatives, Charnwood is in the seat of Fenner.

For the purposes of Australian Capital Territory elections for the ACT Legislative Assembly, Charnwood is in the Ginninderra electorate.

== Geology ==
Rocks in Charnwood are from the Silurian age. Deakin Volcanics purple rhyodacite is found in most of Charnwood. The Deakin Fault passes in the north west direction on the north east edge of the Deakin Volcanics, The fault dropped down the Deakin Volcanics and raised up the south west side. Hawkins Volcanics green-grey dacite and quartz andesite are in the north east on the other side of Deakin Fault.
