= Fraser, Australian Capital Territory =

Fraser
- Suburb
- Coordinates: 35°11′33″S 149°03′02″E
- Country: Australia
- State: Australian Capital Territory
- City: Canberra
- District: Belconnen
- Established: 1975

Government
  - Territory electorate: Ginninderra
  - Federal division: Fenner

Area
  - Total: 2.5 km^{2} (0.97 sq mi)

Population
  - Total: 2,126 (SAL 2021)
- Postcode: 2615
Suburbs around Fraser
Dunlop	Fraser	Spence
Charnwood	Flynn	Melba

Fraser (/ˈfreɪzər/) is a suburb in the Belconnen district of Canberra, located within the Australian Capital Territory, Australia. Fraser lies at the north west end of Belconnen.

The suburb is named after James Reay Fraser, who was Member of the Australian House of Representatives for the Division of Australian Capital Territory from 1951 to 1970 and Vice Chairman of the Joint Committee of the Australian Capital Territory from 1959 to 1970. It was gazetted on 15 January 1974. Streets are named after early residents of Canberra.

Mount Rogers reserve is part of Fraser with an elevation of 704 metres (2,310 ft). Fraser has a neighbourhood oval and primary school. It is bordered to the north by Kuringa Drive.

== Governance ==
For the purposes of Australian federal elections for the House of Representatives, Fraser is in the Division of Fenner.

For the purposes of Australian Capital Territory elections for the ACT Legislative Assembly, Fraser is in the Ginninderra electorate.

== Geology ==
Silurian age Hawkins Volcanics green-grey dacite and quartz andesite fill the underground parts of the suburb.

== Education ==
Fraser Primary School is a local government primary school. It offers education for students from preschool to year 6.
