= Brindabella Christian College =

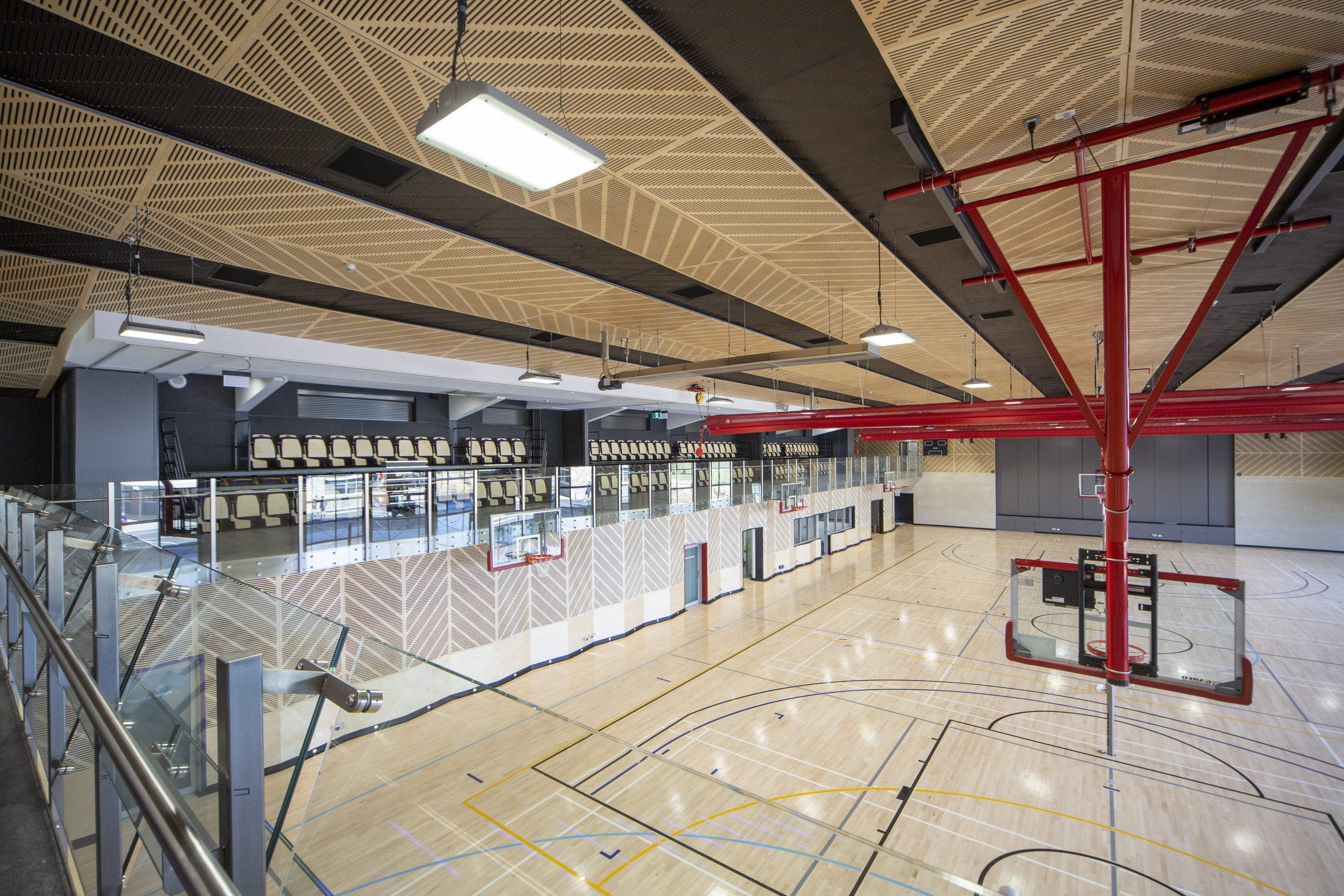

Location
- Charnwood and Lyneham, Canberra, Australian Capital Territory; Australia; 35°14′57″S 149°07′43″E

Information
- Former name: O’Connor Christian School
- Type: private co-educational early learning, primary and secondary day school
- Motto: Wisdom, Integrity, Service and Excellence
- Religious affiliation: Non-denominational Christian
- Established: 1980; 46 years ago
- Founder: Mr David Button
- Principal: Peter Reuben
- Years: Early learning and K–12
- Age range: 3–18
- Campus: 46 Lhotsky Street, Charnwood; 136 Brigalow Street, Lyneham
- Campus type: Suburban
- Colors: Navy, red and white
- Tuition: AU$15,880 per annum
- Affiliations: Christian Schools Australia; Association of Independent Schools ACT
- Website: www.bcc.act.edu.au

Brindabella Christian College (BCC) is a private, non-denominational Christian, co-educational, early learning, primary and secondary day school, located in the Canberra suburbs of Charnwood and Lyneham, in the Australian Capital Territory, Australia.

== History ==
=== Establishment ===
The school was established in 1980 as O'Connor Christian School at the, as an educational outreach of the O'Connor Uniting Church. Opening with 29 children enrolled from Kindergarten to Year 6, with Mr David Button as the founding Principal. Brindabella was opened as a dedicated Christian school focused on Christ-centred. In the first year, enrolment exceeded expectations, resulting in the O’Conner Uniting Church location to not have enough room for the growing enrolment. In 1982, O’Connor Christian School moved to 136 Brigalow Street Lyneham, the same year growing to include year 7 & 8 classes.

=== 1990s ===
In 1998, the school split from the O'Connor Uniting Church, and established itself as the current name, Brindabella Christian College. In the years following, the growth of the school continued, allowing it to cater for the years through to Year 12.

== Governance and legal issues ==
In 2024, it was discovered that the school had not been paying mandatory employee superannuation entitlements, in some cases, going back up to 5 years. The Independent Education Union took the matter to the Fair Work Commission, however despite reassurances from the school board, overdue superannuation amounts are still owing in early 2025.

In August 2024, the then-principal of the school, Keturah Jones, resigned from her position. It was noted that this was the ninth principal to resign from the school over nine years, all of which have been attributed to a toxic workplace culture brought on from the school board for this duration.

In January 2025, the school saw a dramatic drop in both staff and student numbers, in part due to the ongoing superannuation and workplace issues. The board chair reports a drop of 200-250 enrollments from the previous year.

In February 2025, the Australian Taxation Office sought to wind up the school over an outstanding tax debt that has grown year-on-year to $8 million, while also failing to meet their mandatory repayments as agreed in the previous year. At the same time, staff were not paid, and superannuation payments are still outstanding. The Department of Education has also informed the school that they will not receive federal funding, as the school hasn't submitted their mandatory financial reports for the past 2 years, and the board has previously shown to be financially unfit to run the school.

== See also ==
- List of schools in the Australian Capital Territory
