= Melba Copland Secondary School =

Coordinates: 35.213°S 149.06°E

Information
- Established: 1978; 48 years ago
- Website: www.mcss.act.edu.au

Melba Copland Secondary School was opened in 1978 at Copland Drive, Melba, Australian Capital Territory, Australia.

In 2007, it was decided by the ACT Government to merge Copland College and Melba High School. Since 2009 the joint school has been called Melba Copland Secondary School.

== History ==
In 2008 Copland College was merged with Melba High School. The public announcement was that the two campuses would be shared. It is now known as Melba Copland Secondary School. Copland College is known for its competitive nature against other schools within the ACT in terms of the UAI the year 12 students receive. In 2006, Copland College was ranked the third highest ranking college in the ACT. This has had an effect on the students that have enrolled and are currently studying at the school. In 2022 Melba Copland Highschool achieved 22nd place in the National Shoebox Challenge (NSC).
