= Melba, Australian Capital Territory =

Suburb of Canberra, Australian Capital Territory

Melba
- Suburb
- Coordinates: 35°12′30″S 149°03′15″E
- Country: Australia
- State: Australian Capital Territory
- City: Canberra
- District: Belconnen
- Location: 14 km (8.7 mi) NW of Canberra CBD; 30 km (19 mi) NW of Queanbeyan; 96 km (60 mi) SW of Goulburn; 293 km (182 mi) SW of Sydney
- Established: 1972

Government
  - Territory electorate: Ginninderra
  - Federal division: Fenner

Area
  - Total: 2.3 km^{2} (0.89 sq mi)
- Elevation: 582 m (1,909 ft)

Population
  - Total: 3,383 (SAL 2021)
- Postcode: 2615
Suburbs around Melba
Fraser	Spence	Evatt
Flynn	Melba	Evatt
Latham	Florey	Florey

Melba is a residential suburb in the Belconnen district of Canberra, located within the Australian Capital Territory, Australia. The suburb of Melba is named after Dame Nellie Melba (1861–1931), the first internationally recognised Australian opera soprano. The streets are named after composers, singers and other musically notable Australians or people with strong Australian connections.

== Features ==
Located in Melba are a government run primary school (Mount Rogers Community School), and a merged secondary school, Melba Copland Secondary School, a merge of Melba High School and Copland College.

Melba Tennis Club and its eight courts are located adjacent to the playing fields. A former member of the club is Annabel Ellwood, whose highest ranking on the WTA Women's Professional Tour was 57 for singles and 60 for Doubles in 1997. Ellwood's name appears on the honour board in the clubhouse.

== Governance ==
For the purposes of Australian federal elections for the House of Representatives, Melba is in the Division of Fenner.

For the purposes of Australian Capital Territory elections for the ACT Legislative Assembly, Melba is in the Ginninderra electorate.

== Geology ==
A porphyry of Green-grey Dacitic intrusive containing large white Feldspar crystals is found in the north east corner. Green grey dacitic tuff from the Hawkins Volcanics occur on the south east side of Melba. Green grey dacite and quartz andesite occur in the north west to the south east. This is intruded by a band of Glebe Farm Adamellite. Deakin Volcanics purple rhyodacite with a patch of purple and green tuff are in the south west. The Deakin Fault runs north west through Melba and is marked by quartz.

== People honoured in the streets of Melba ==
- Alda Place – Frances Alda, New Zealand-born soprano
- Amadio Place – Neville Amadio, flautist
- Bainton Crescent – Edgar Bainton, British composer and Director of the New South Wales Conservatorium of Music
- Bishop Place – John Bishop (1903–1964), music academic and pioneer
- Boult Place – Arthur Boult, organist, the first organist at St Peter's Cathedral, Adelaide, 1877–91
- Bowden Place – Alfred Henry Bowden, violinist and pianist
- Brahe Place – May Brahe (1884–1956), composer
- Brash Place – James Brash (1881–1861), composer, conductor and adjudicator; Musical Editor, Chappell and Company
- Brier Place – Percy Brier, (1885–1970), pianist, organist, conductor and composer; a founder of the Brisbane Chamber Music Society; founded the Music Teachers' Association of Queensland, and the Guild of Composers
- Brownlee Place – John Brownlee, baritone who often sang with Melba
- Buckman Place
- Cade Place – William Cade, first conductor of the Adelaide Symphony Orchestra
- Carandini Street – Marie Carandini, soprano
- Carey Place
- Castles Place – Amy Castles (1880–1951), soprano
- Charvin Court – Yvonne Charvin (née Leverrier) (1879-1917); studied piano with Josef Kretschmann, Sydney, 1896, and with Theodor Leschetizky, Vienna, 1898; taught and performed in Paris; returned to Australia in 1903; performed at the Sydney Town Hall in 1904; taught at the NSW Conservatorium; decorated by the French Government with Croix Rouge Francaise for concert work for Red Cross, 1914–15; sister of Frank Leverrier.
- Chinner Crescent – Norman Chinner (1909–1961), organist and conductor
- Clifford Crescent
- Clutsam Place – George Clutsam, piano accompanist to Melba, composer
- Conley Drive
- Coutts Place
- Crossley Close – Ada Crossley, contralto, renowned in oratorio
- Delaney Court
- D'Hage Circuit – Louis D'Hage, violinist and teacher
- Ennis Place
- Flower Place
- Goldner Circuit – Richard Goldner, Romanian-born violist and founder of Musica Viva Australia
- Goossens Place – Sir Eugene Goossens, composer, conductor and advocate for the building of the Sydney Opera House
- Grainger Circuit – Percy Grainger, pianist and composer
- Alfred Hill Drive – Alfred Hill, composer
- Henslowe Place
- Horsley Cres
- Hosking Place
- Ives Court
- Keats Place – Horace Keats (1895–1945), UK-born composer
- Kruse Place
- Laver Place
- Le Gallienne Street – Dorian Le Gallienne, composer and critic
- Levey Place
- Linger Place – Carl Linger, German-born composer
- Lovelock Court – Dr William Lovelock, English composer and critic, and first Director of the Queensland Conservatorium of Music
- Lyster Place
- McEachern Crescent – Malcolm McEachern, bass singer in opera and oratorio; he made a famous recording of the Gendarmes' Duet with Harold Williams
- Marsh Place – composer and music publisher in late 1800s
- Mewton Place – Noel Mewton-Wood, pianist
- Miranda Place
- Orchard Place – W. Arundel Orchard, organist, pianist, composer, conductor, and Director of the New South Wales Conservatorium of Music
- Paling Place – Willem Paling (1825–1895), Dutch-born violinist, teacher, piano manufacturer and founder of Paling's music stores
- Sampson Close
- Saville Close
- Scarlett Street – Robert Dalley-Scarlett (1887–1959), organist and choral conductor
- Sharp Place
- Sherwin Place
- Stewart Crescent – Nellie Stewart, actress and popular singer
- Stralia Place – Elsa Stralia, soprano
- Traynor Court
- Treharne Place
- Verbrugghen Street – Henri Verbrugghen, Belgian violinist and first Director of the New South Wales Conservatorium of Music
- Wallace Place
- Zelman Place – Alberto Zelman, founder and conductor of the Melbourne Symphony Orchestra
