= Spence, Australian Capital Territory =

Spence
- Suburb
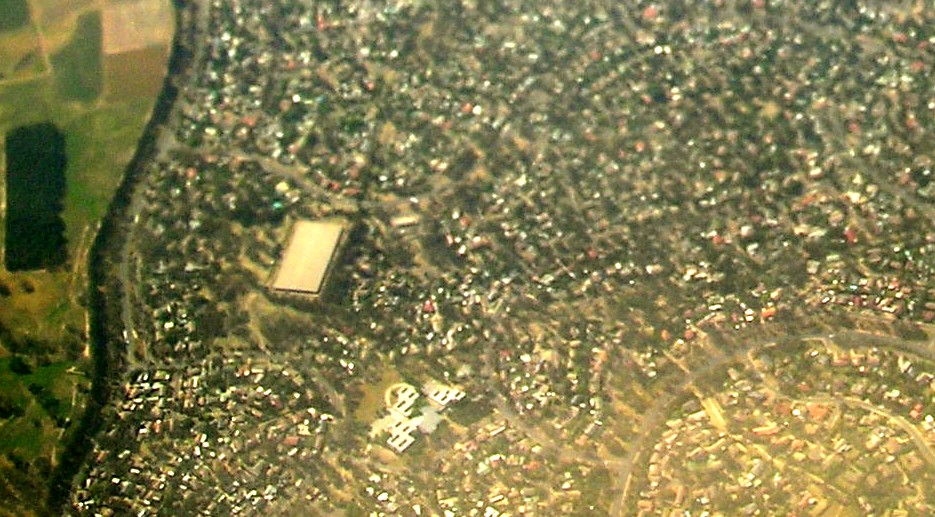
- Aerial view of Spence

- Coordinates: 35°11′56″S 149°03′55″E
- Country: Australia
- State: Australian Capital Territory
- City: Canberra
- District: Belconnen
- Location: 15 km (9.3 mi) NW of Canberra CBD; 30 km (19 mi) NW of Queanbeyan; 95 km (59 mi) SW of Goulburn; 292 km (181 mi) SW of Sydney
- Established: 1972

Government
  - Territory electorate: Ginninderra
  - Federal division: Fenner

Area
  - Total: 1.5 km^{2} (0.58 sq mi)
- Elevation: 636 m (2,087 ft)

Population
  - Total: 2,587 (SAL 2021)
- Postcode: 2615
Suburbs around Spence
Fraser	Spence	Evatt
Melba	Evatt	Evatt

Spence (/ˈspɛns/) is a residential suburb in the Belconnen district of Canberra, located within the Australian Capital Territory, Australia. It was gazetted on 2 November 1972, and streets are named after trade unionists.

The suburb was originally named solely after William Spence (1846–1926), one of the founders of the Australian Workers' Union and later a member of the first Australian House of Representatives. In 2023, it was co-named retrospectively to commemorate suffragette Catherine Helen Spence as well.

== Location and features ==
Spence is located adjacent to the suburbs of Fraser, Melba and Evatt. Nearby is a CSIRO property. The suburb is to the south of Owen Dixon Drive and Kuringa Drive and also bounded by Alpen Street and Copland Drive.

The local primary school, Spence Primary School, was established in 1977. It later merged with Melba Primary School to become Mount Rogers Community School—Spence Campus. The school closed at the end of 1998 due to a lack of enrolment. Students were encouraged to move to the Melba Campus. The former school buildings now house a number of community-based organisations including the Mount Rogers Community (Anglican) Church. A donation only cafe called "Coffee Corner" is run by the church.

Spence has a neighbourhood oval, bordering Clarey Crescent, which has been in great disrepair since the drought of 2002/2003. The other area of bush and open space is the water tower in the northwest of the suburb. The "tower" is built into a hill with only a small portion showing.

The local shopping centre has a butcher, hairdresser, baker, chemist and supermarket, along with a petrol station. The supermarket includes a coffee shop. Another local supermarket, known as the Spence/Evatt Shops, is located on Copland Drive. Next to it is the Tongan Community Centre, rebuilt in 2007 after it burned down earlier in that year.

== Governance ==
For the purposes of Australian federal elections for the House of Representatives, Spence is in the Fenner.

For the purposes of Australian Capital Territory elections for the ACT Legislative Assembly, Spence is in the Ginninderra electorate.

== Geology ==
Silurian age Hawkins Volcanics green-grey dacite and quartz andesite are in the centre and west of Spence. A green grey dacitic porphyry intrusive rock with white feldspar crystals is in the southeast of the suburb. There is a Hawkins Volcanics shale lens patch in the south central part.
