= Rhyodacite =

Volcanic rock rich in silica and low in alkali metal oxides

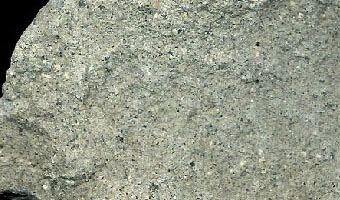
A sample of rhyodacite from Slovakia

Rhyodacite is a volcanic rock intermediate in composition between dacite and rhyolite. It is the extrusive equivalent of those plutonic rocks that are intermediate in composition between monzogranite and granodiorite. Rhyodacites form from rapid cooling of lava relatively rich in silica and low in alkali metal oxides. It is no longer an official rock type, though the term can still be seen being used in older resources.

== Description ==
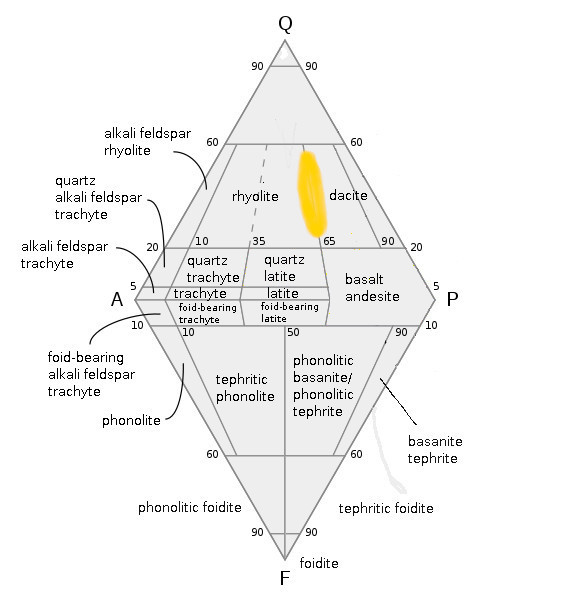
QAPF diagram with the approximate location of rhyodacite highlighted

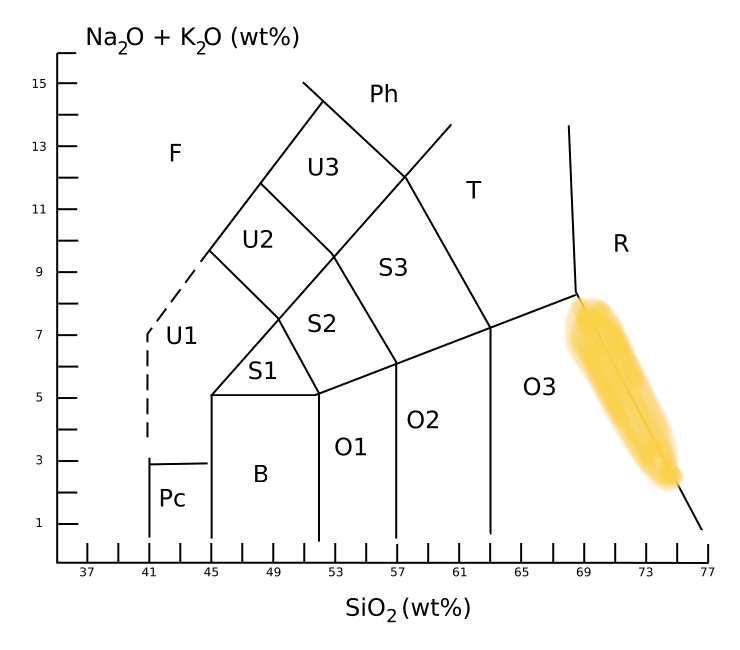
TAS diagram with the approximate position of rhyodacite highlighted in yellow (T=trachyte or trachydacite; R=rhyolite; O3=dacite)

Under IUGS guidelines, rhyodacites are not formally defined in either the QAPF classification, used to classify igneous rocks by their mineral content, or the TAS classification, used to classify volcanic rocks chemically. However, the IUGS allows the use of the term to describe rocks close to the boundary between the rhyolite and dacite fields in each classification scheme. Rhyodacite then describes a fine-grained igneous rock containing between 20% and 60% quartz and in which plagioclase makes up about two-thirds of the total feldspar content. Such a rock will contain between 69% and 72% silica by weight.

The U.S. Geological Survey defines rhyodacite as volcanic rock containing 20% to 60% quartz and with plagioclase making up 35% to 65% of the total feldspar content. This makes rhyodacite the extrusive equivalent of monzogranite.

In addition to its quartz and feldspar content, rhyodacite commonly contains phenocrysts of andesine, biotite, hornblende, and pyroxene. Quartz and sanidine phenocrysts are less common than in rhyolite, and rhyolite has only scant mafic phenocrysts.

== Occurrence ==
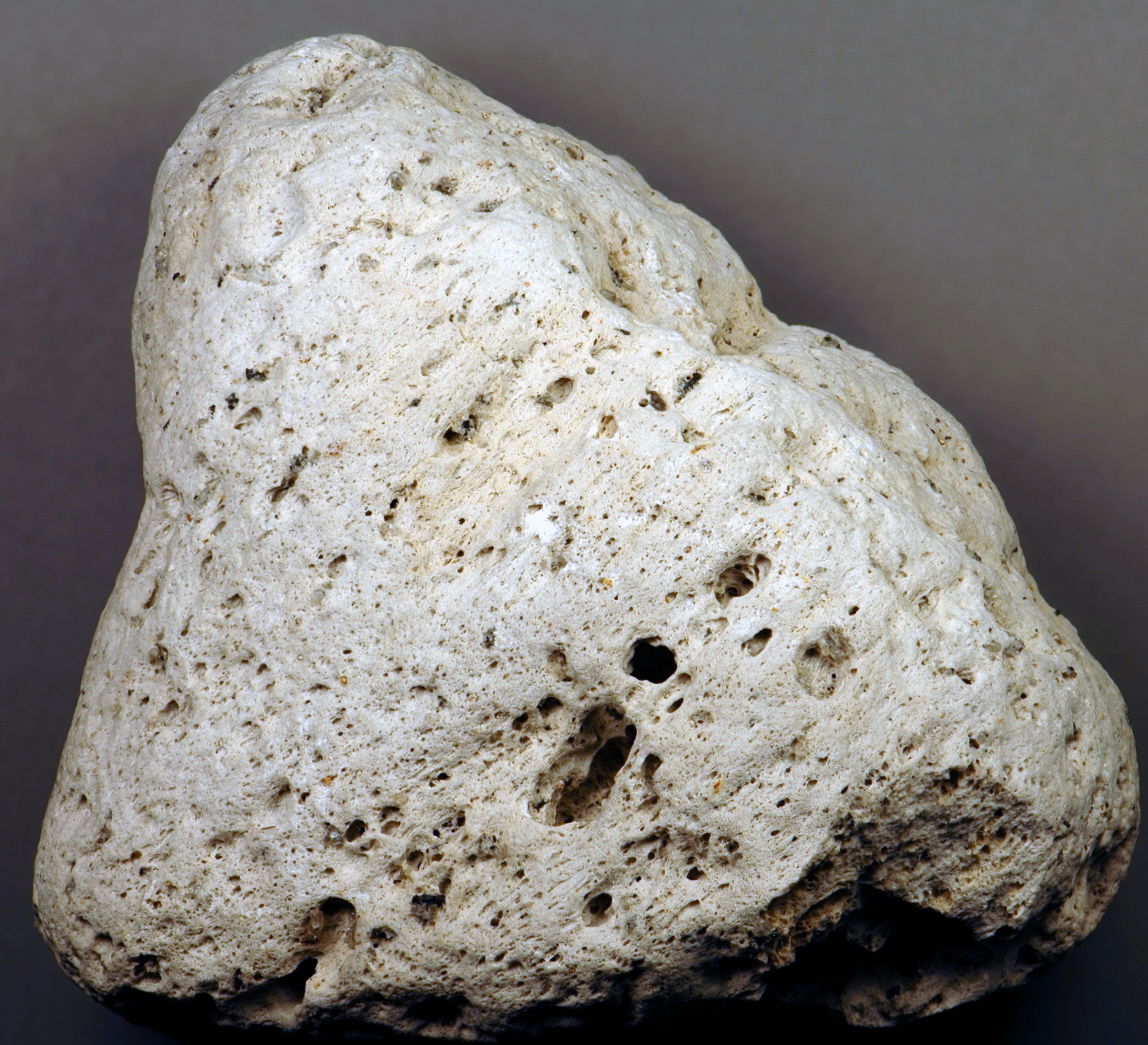
Rhyodacite pumice from the late August 1883 eruption of Krakatoa. This rock floated across the Indian Ocean for almost a year before it washed ashore at Takwa Beach, Kenya, East Africa.

Like other silica-rich compositions, rhyodacites are more abundant as pyroclastic rock than as lava flows. These include extensive ash flows and fallout sheets that are important stratigraphic markers.

Rhyodacite lava flows occur in northwestern Ferry County (Washington), and at An Sgùrr on the island of Eigg in Scotland.
