= Partnership (cricket) =

Term in sport of cricket

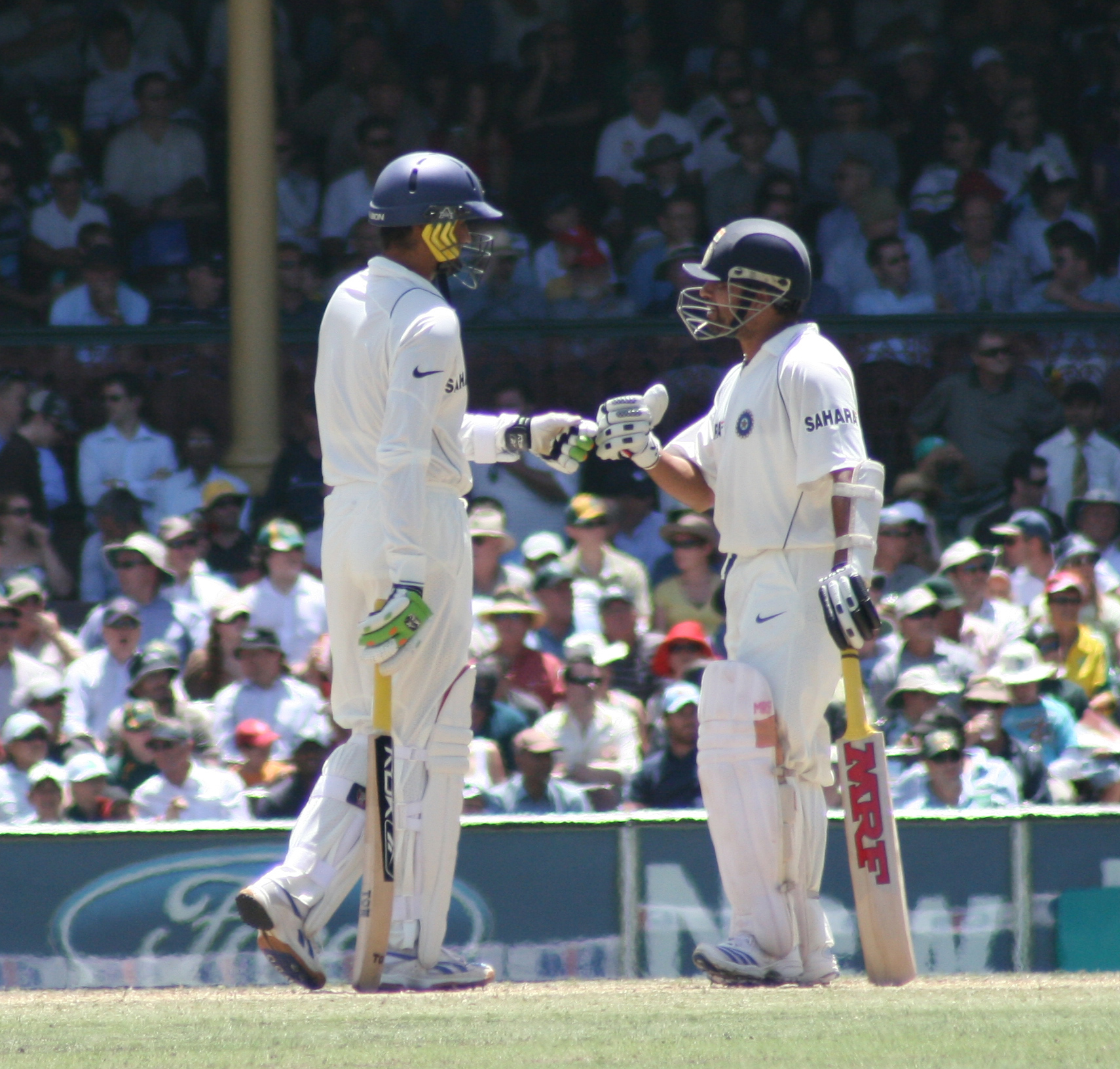
Harbhajan Singh and Sachin Tendulkar batting in a partnership.

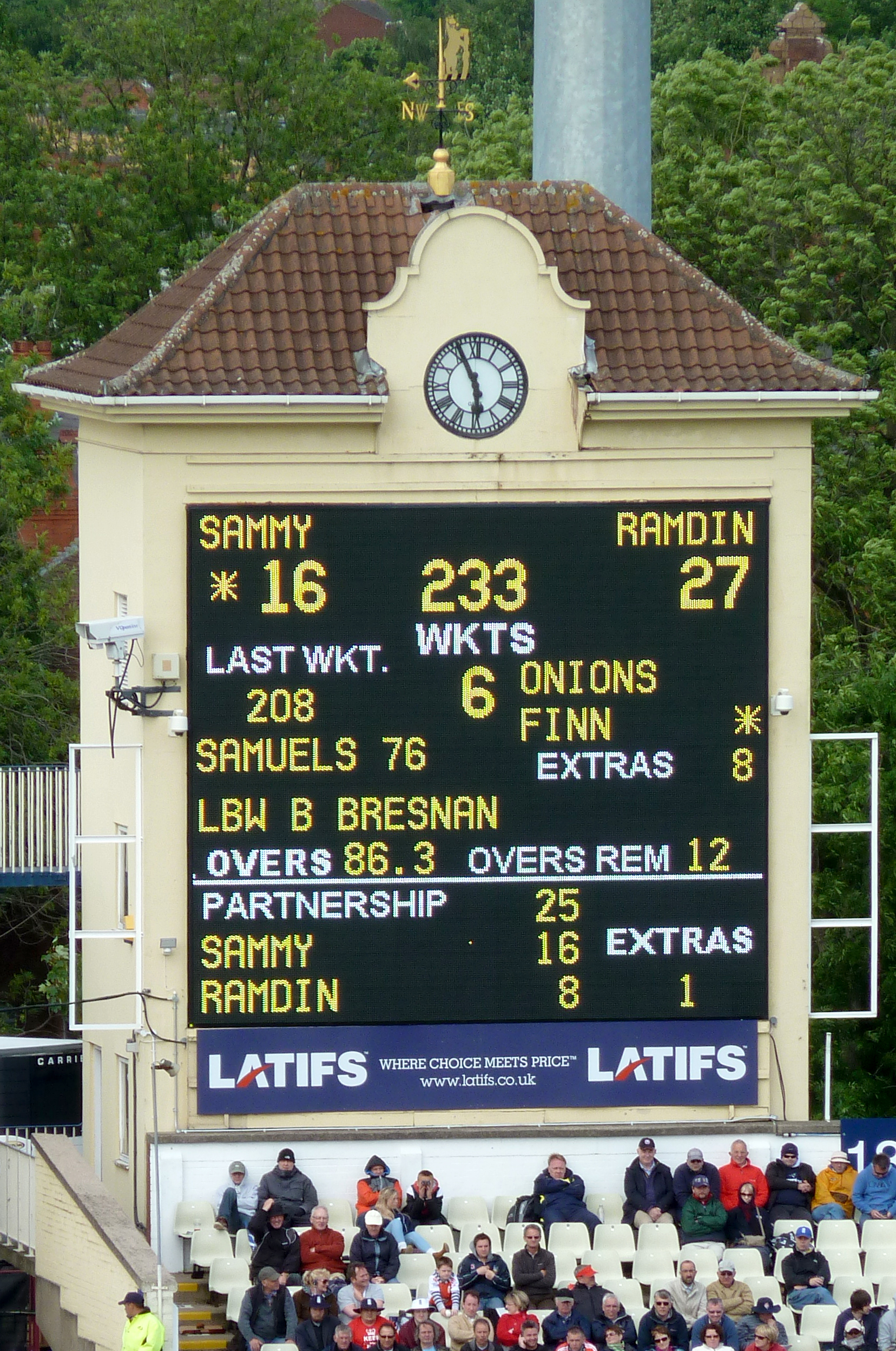
Scoreboard showing runs scored by the current partnership (25), consisting of 16 by Sammy, 8 by Ramdin (out of his 27 total), and 1 extra.

A partnership in cricket refers to the collaboration between two batters and the runs they accumulate together, including extras. While both batters are involved in a partnership, only one is the striker at any given time. A partnership between two batters ends when one of them is dismissed, retires, or when the innings concludes. An innings may end due to a victory being achieved, a declaration, the expiration of a time or over limit, or the abandonment of the match. In exceptional circumstances, if one of the original batters is injured, a substitute runner may complete runs on their behalf. However, any runs scored will still be recorded as part of the partnership between the two original batters. The term partnership may also refer to two bowlers delivering alternate overs from opposite ends of the wicket.

== Strategy in cricket ==
Strong batting cohesion in partnerships is widely regarded as an important aspect of cricket. Generally, top-order batters are superior to lower-order batters; therefore, partnerships are usually more substantial when formed between two top-order batters. However, it is relatively common for a lower-order batter with strong defensive skills to intelligently rotate the strike, preserving wickets while maintaining the scoring rate—a strategy frequently employed in both One Day Internationals and Test cricket.

Many believe that a key to a successful partnership is the contrast in playing styles between the two batters. For instance, Marcus Trescothick, known for his aggressive batting style, and Mike Atherton, renowned for his defensive approach, formed successful opening partnerships for England. Similarly, differences in physical appearance may also contribute to an effective partnership. An example of this is Zak Crawley and Ben Duckett—Crawley is a tall right-handed batter, whereas Duckett is a much shorter left-handed batter. It is encouraged that batters rotate the strike regularly, allowing both players to face the bowler, while effective communication when calling runs is considered crucial for a successful partnership.

Lower-order partnerships are generally much smaller than those formed earlier in an innings. In certain scenarios, middle- and lower-order batters tend to score at a higher strike rate. This approach aims to maximise runs before running out of batting partners, a tactic commonly employed when a Test team is considering a declaration or when a one-day innings is nearing its conclusion.

Batters such as Adam Gilchrist and Andrew Flintoff are widely regarded as some of the best middle-order players in cricket history. Similarly, when no recognised batters remain, tail-end batters often adopt an aggressive approach to add as many runs as possible before the team is all out. Another common scenario occurs when one recognised batter remains alongside a tail-end batter; in such cases, the recognised batter may attempt to retain strike as frequently as possible. A notable example of this strategy occurred in Test cricket during the 2019 Ashes Series at Headingley, where Ben Stokes and Jack Leach produced a crucial 75-run partnership to secure a dramatic victory for England.

=== In red-ball cricket ===
In Test and first-class cricket, the primary focus of an opening partnership is often to negotiate the new ball, which typically offers greater movement and bounce. In later partnerships, the emphasis shifts towards consolidating the innings, facing an ageing ball and spin bowling, and eventually preparing for the second new ball.

The importance of batting in partnership becomes even more crucial when only one recognised quality batter remains. In such situations, their role includes guiding the lower-order batters while attempting to accumulate as many runs as possible or, in some cases, simply trying to save the match.

Minimising risk is essential, often achieved by shielding the lesser batters from strike as much as possible. Boundaries and twos are preferred, while singles are generally avoided, particularly early in the over. However, it may become necessary to take a single or three runs on the final delivery of the over to manage the change of ends and maintain strike.

=== In white-ball cricket ===
In T20 and One Day International (ODI) cricket, batters often aim to score at a higher strike rate, with this approach being particularly evident during the powerplay.

The West Indies hold the record for the highest partnership in ODI cricket, achieved against Zimbabwe in Canberra on 24 February 2015. Marlon Samuels and Chris Gayle shared a 372-run partnership for the second wicket.

== Effect on the opposition ==
Large partnerships contribute more than just runs to the scoreboard; they can also exhaust and demoralise the fielding team. This was particularly evident in the famous Test match at Eden Gardens in 2001, when India's V. V. S. Laxman and Rahul Dravid shared a 376-run partnership for the fifth wicket, occupying the crease for the entire fourth day's play without being dismissed. Despite having enforced the follow-on, Steve Waugh's highly regarded Australian side was left emotionally and physically drained, ultimately succumbing to a shocking 171-run defeat.

Even if not as numerically significant, unexpectedly large last-wicket stands can still be highly demoralising. When the number 11 batter walks out to bat, many fielders anticipate a swift conclusion and begin mentally preparing for their own innings. If the final-wicket partnership extends much longer than expected, it can disrupt their focus, drain their energy, and undermine their composure. Additionally, failing to dismiss a team’s weakest batter with ease can damage the confidence of the bowlers.

A notable example occurred in the first Test between Australia and New Zealand at the Brisbane Cricket Ground in 2004. New Zealand performed well over the first two days, and although Australia recovered strongly on the third, the match remained finely balanced when Glenn McGrath—a fast bowler and notoriously poor batter—joined fellow tailender Jason Gillespie with nine wickets down. Against expectations, the pair put on a remarkable 114-run partnership, with both batters reaching half centuries—McGrath’s first in a long Test career in which he never averaged more than eight with the bat. The deflated New Zealand side lost energy and focus, and when they finally dismissed McGrath and went in to bat, their batting order collapsed to 76 all out, handing Australia an innings victory with a day to spare.

Another famous example came during the second Test of the 2005 Ashes. Australia's tailenders Shane Warne, Michael Kasprowicz, and Brett Lee defied England’s bowlers in a tense final innings, nearly pulling off an improbable victory. Despite their top order being dismantled, the lower order held firm and took the game to the brink, ultimately falling just two runs short—the narrowest margin of victory in Ashes history.

== Bowling partnerships ==
Two bowlers are said to be bowling in tandem when they deliver all the overs in a specific sequence of consecutive overs.

James Anderson and Stuart Broad hold the record for the most wickets taken in a bowling partnership, having claimed a total of 1,039 wickets together.

== Test record partnerships by wicket ==
Correct as of 11 October 2024

Wicket	Runs	Batting partners	Batting team	Fielding team	Venue	Season
1st	415	Neil McKenzie and Graeme Smith	South Africa	Bangladesh	Chattogram	2008
2nd	576	Roshan Mahanama and Sanath Jayasuriya	Sri Lanka	India	Colombo (RPS)	1997
3rd	624	Mahela Jayawardene and Kumar Sangakkara	Sri Lanka	South Africa	Colombo (SSC)	2006
4th	454	Joe Root and Harry Brook	England	Pakistan	Multan	2024
5th	405	Donald Bradman and Sid Barnes	Australia	England	Sydney	1946/47
6th	399	Ben Stokes and Jonny Bairstow	England	South Africa	Cape Town	2016
7th	347	Clairmonte Depeiaza and Denis Atkinson	West Indies	Australia	Bridgetown	1954/55
8th	332	Jonathan Trott and Stuart Broad	England	Pakistan	Lord's	2010
9th	195	Mark Boucher and Pat Symcox	South Africa	Pakistan	Johannesburg	1998
10th	198	Joe Root and James Anderson	England	India	Nottingham	2014

== Top 10 Test partnerships (for any wicket) ==
Correct as of 11 October 2024

Runs	Wicket	Batting partners	Batting team	Fielding team	Venue	Season
624	3rd	Mahela Jayawardene and Kumar Sangakkara	Sri Lanka	South Africa	Colombo (SSC)	2006
576	2nd	Roshan Mahanama and Sanath Jayasuriya	Sri Lanka	India	Colombo (RPS)	1997
467	3rd	Andrew Jones and Martin Crowe	New Zealand	Sri Lanka	Wellington	1990/91
454	4th	Joe Root and Harry Brook	England	Pakistan	Multan	2024
451	2nd	Donald Bradman and Bill Ponsford	Australia	England	The Oval	1934
451	3rd	Mudassar Nazar and Javed Miandad	Pakistan	India	Hyderabad	1982/83
449	4th	Adam Voges and Shaun Marsh	Australia	West Indies	Hobart	2015/16
446	2nd	Conrad Hunte and Gary Sobers	West Indies	Pakistan	Kingston, Jamaica	1957/58
438	2nd	Marvan Atapattu and Kumar Sangakkara	Sri Lanka	Zimbabwe	Bulawayo	2004
437	4th	Mahela Jayawardene and Thilan Samaraweera	Sri Lanka	Pakistan	Karachi	2008/09

* = unbroken partnership

== First-class record partnerships by wicket ==
Correct as of 1 November 2021

Wicket	Runs	Batting partners	Batting team	Fielding team	Venue	Season
1st	561	Waheed Mirza and Mansoor Akhtar	Karachi Whites	Quetta	Karachi	1976/77
2nd	580	Rafatullah Mohmand and Aamer Sajjad	WAPDA	SSGC	Sheikhupura	2009/10
3rd	624	Mahela Jayawardene and Kumar Sangakkara	Sri Lanka	South Africa	Colombo (SSC)	2006
4th	577	Vijay Hazare and Gul Mohammad	Baroda	Holkar	Baroda	1946/47
5th	520*	Cheteshwar Pujara and Ravindra Jadeja	Saurashtra	Orissa	Rajkot	2008/09
6th	487*	George Headley and Clarence Passailaigue	Jamaica	Lord Tennyson's XI	Kingston, Jamaica	1931/32
7th	460	Bhupinder Singh and Pankaj Dharmani	Punjab	Delhi	Delhi	1994/95
8th	433	Arthur Sims and Victor Trumper	Australia	Canterbury	Christchurch	1913/14
9th	283	John Chapman and Arnold Warren	Derbyshire	Warwickshire	Blackwell	1910
10th	307	Alan Kippax and Hal Hooker	New South Wales	Victoria	MCG	1928/29

* = unbroken partnership

== Top 10 first-class partnerships (for any wicket) ==
Correct as of 1 November 2021

Runs	Wicket	Batting partners	Batting team	Fielding team	Venue	Season
624	3rd	Mahela Jayawardene and Kumar Sangakkara	Sri Lanka	South Africa	Colombo (SSC)	2006
594*	3rd	Swapnil Gugale and Ankit Bawne	Maharashtra	Delhi	Mumbai	2016/17
580	2nd	Rafatullah Mohmand and Aamer Sajjad	WAPDA	SSGC	Sheikhupura	2009/10
577	4th	Vijay Hazare and Gul Mohammad	Baroda	Holkar	Baroda	1946/47
576	2nd	Roshan Mahanama and Sanath Jayasuriya	Sri Lanka	India	Colombo (RPS)	1997
574*	4th	Frank Worrell and Clyde Walcott	Barbados	Trinidad	Port-of-Spain	1945/46
561	1st	Waheed Mirza and Mansoor Akhtar	Karachi Whites	Quetta	Karachi	1976/77
555	1st	Percy Holmes and Herbert Sutcliffe	Yorkshire	Essex	Leyton	1932
554	1st	Jack Brown and John Tunnicliffe	Yorkshire	Derbyshire	Chesterfield	1898
539	3rd	Sagar Jogiyani and Ravindra Jadeja	Saurashtra	Gujarat	Surat	2012/13

* = unbroken partnership.

== One-Day International record partnerships by wicket ==
Correct as of 7 November 2023

Wicket	Runs	Batting partners	Batting team	Fielding team	Venue	Date
2nd	365	John Campbell and Shai Hope	West Indies	Ireland	Dublin	5 May 2019
1st	372	Chris Gayle and Marlon Samuels	West Indies	Zimbabwe	Canberra	24 February 2015
3rd	258	Darren Bravo and Denesh Ramdin	West Indies	Bangladesh	Basseterre	25 August 2014
4th	275*	Mohammad Azharuddin and Ajay Jadeja	India	Zimbabwe	Cuttack	9 April 1998
5th	256*	David Miller and JP Duminy	South Africa	Zimbabwe	Hamilton	15 February 2015
6th	267*	Grant Elliott and Luke Ronchi	New Zealand	Sri Lanka	Dunedin	23 January 2015
7th	177	Jos Buttler and Adil Rashid	England	New Zealand	Birmingham	9 June 2015
8th	202*	Glenn Maxwell and Pat Cummins	Australia	Afghanistan	Mumbai	7 November 2023
9th	132	Angelo Mathews and Lasith Malinga	Sri Lanka	Australia	Melbourne	3 November 2010
10th	106*	Viv Richards and Michael Holding	West Indies	England	Manchester	31 May 1984

* = unbroken partnership

== Top 10 One-Day International partnerships (for any wicket) ==
Correct as of 10 December 2022

Runs	Wicket	Batting partners	Batting team	Fielding team	Venue	Date
372	2nd	Chris Gayle and Marlon Samuels	West Indies	Zimbabwe	Canberra	23 February 2015
365	1st	John Campbell and Shai Hope	West Indies	Ireland	Dublin	5 May 2019
331	2nd	Sachin Tendulkar and Rahul Dravid	India	New Zealand	Hyderabad	8 November 1999
318	2nd	Saurav Ganguly and Rahul Dravid	India	Sri Lanka	Taunton	26 May 1999
304	1st	Imam-ul-Haq and Fakhar Zaman	Pakistan	Zimbabwe	Bulawayo	20 July 2018
292	1st	Tamim Iqbal and Liton Das	Bangladesh	Zimbabwe	Sylhet	6 March 2020
290	2nd	Ishan Kishan and Virat Kohli	India	Bangladesh	Chittagong	10 December 2022
286	1st	Upul Tharanga and Sanath Jayasuriya	Sri Lanka	England	Leeds	1 July 2006
284	1st	David Warner and Travis Head	Australia	Pakistan	Adelaide	26 January 2017
282*	1st	Quinton de Kock and Hashim Amla	South Africa	Bangladesh	Kimberley	15 October 2017
282	1st	Upul Tharanga and Tillekeratne Dilshan	Sri Lanka	Zimbabwe	Pallekele	10 March 2011

* = unbroken partnership
