= Pakistani cricket team in the West Indies in 2021 =

International cricket tour

	West Indies	Pakistan
- Dates: 28 July – 24 August 2021
Captains	Kraigg Brathwaite (Tests); Kieron Pollard (T20Is)	Babar Azam

Test series
- Result: 2-match series drawn 1–1
Most runs	Jason Holder (147)	Babar Azam (193)
Most wickets	Jayden Seales (11)	Shaheen Afridi (18)
- Player of the series: Shaheen Afridi (Pak)

Twenty20 International series
- Results: Pakistan won the 4-match series 1–0
Most runs	Nicholas Pooran (75)	Babar Azam (51)
Most wickets	Jason Holder (4)	Hasan Ali (3)

The Pakistan cricket team toured the West Indies in July and August 2021 to play two Tests and four Twenty20 International (T20I) matches. The Test series was part of the 2021–2023 ICC World Test Championship. The fixtures for the tour were confirmed by Cricket West Indies in May 2021. The T20I series was originally scheduled for five matches. However, this was changed to four T20Is, following the rescheduled One Day International (ODI) fixtures in the West Indies' series against Australia.

The T20I series was heavily impacted by rain, with three of the four matches washed out and ending in no results. In the third match, only six minutes of play were possible before the match was called off. The only match to be completed was the second, with Pakistan winning by seven runs. Therefore, Pakistan won the four-match series 1–0.

The Test series began with a single-wicket victory by the hosts at Sabina Park, reminiscent of previous tight finishes between the two sides, such as in Antigua in 2000 and in Dominica in 2017. Pakistan won the second Test match by 109 runs, with the series being drawn 1–1.

== Squads ==
Tests		T20Is	
West Indies	Pakistan	West Indies	Pakistan
Kraigg Brathwaite (c); Jermaine Blackwood (vc); Nkrumah Bonner; Shamarh Brooks; Rahkeem Cornwall; Roston Chase; Joshua Da Silva (wk); Jahmar Hamilton; Chemar Holder; Jason Holder; Shai Hope; Alzarri Joseph; Kyle Mayers; Kieran Powell; Kemar Roach; Jayden Seales; Jomel Warrican	Babar Azam (c); Mohammad Rizwan (vc, wk); Mohammad Abbas; Shaheen Afridi; Sarfaraz Ahmed (wk); Abid Ali; Azhar Ali; Hasan Ali; Nauman Ali; Fawad Alam; Faheem Ashraf; Imran Butt; Shahnawaz Dahani; Sajid Khan; Zahid Mahmood; ~~Mohammad Nawaz~~; ~~Haris Rauf~~; Abdullah Shafique; Naseem Shah; Saud Shakeel; Yasir Shah	Kieron Pollard (c); Nicholas Pooran (vc, wk); Fabian Allen; Dwayne Bravo; Sheldon Cottrell; Fidel Edwards; Andre Fletcher (wk); Chris Gayle; Shimron Hetmyer; Jason Holder; Akeal Hosein; Evin Lewis; Obed McCoy; Andre Russell; Romario Shepherd; Lendl Simmons; Kevin Sinclair; Oshane Thomas; Hayden Walsh Jr.	Babar Azam (c); Shadab Khan (vc); Shaheen Afridi; Sarfaraz Ahmed (wk); ~~Haider Ali~~; Hasan Ali; Faheem Ashraf; Mohammad Hafeez; Mohammad Hasnain; Arshad Iqbal; Azam Khan; Sharjeel Khan; Sohaib Maqsood; Mohammad Nawaz; Usman Qadir; Haris Rauf; Mohammad Rizwan (wk); Imad Wasim; Mohammad Wasim; Fakhar Zaman

On 18 May 2021, Cricket West Indies named a 18-man provisional squad for the T20I matches, with Kieron Pollard captaining the team. On 24 June 2021, Haider Ali was withdrawn from Pakistan's T20I squad, after breaching the bio-secure bubble at the 2021 Pakistan Super League tournament. Sohaib Maqsood was named as his replacement. Pakistan's Azam Khan suffered a head injury during a training session and was ruled out of the second and third T20Is. Romario Shepherd was added to the West Indies' squad for the second T20I. On 11 August 2021, Mohammad Nawaz and Haris Rauf were both released from Pakistan's Test squad.

== Warm-up match ==
Ahead of the Test series, the West Indies played a four-day intra-squad match at Sabina Park in Jamaica.

3–6 August 2021
Scorecard

Kraigg Brathwaite XI	v	Jermaine Blackwood XI
173 (71 overs); Kraigg Brathwaite 77* (219); Veerasammy Permaul 5/38 (17 overs)		261 (87.5 overs); Jermaine Blackwood 62 (143); Roston Chase 2/11 (7 overs)
333/9d (99.2 overs); Shamarh Brooks 134 (236); Rahkeem Cornwall 5/67 (26.2 overs)		140/4 (36.2 overs); Nkrumah Bonner 53* (114); Alzarri Joseph 1/6 (4 overs)

Match drawn
Sabina Park, Jamaica
Umpires: Verdayne Smith (WI) and Christopher Taylor (WI)

- Kraigg Brathwaite XI won the toss and elected to bat.

== T20I series ==
=== 1st T20I ===
28 July 2021
10:00
Scorecard

West Indies; 85/5 (9 overs)	v	Pakistan
Kieron Pollard 22* (9); Hasan Ali 2/11 (2 overs)

No result
Kensington Oval, Barbados
Umpires: Gregory Brathwaite (WI) and Nigel Duguid (WI)

- Pakistan won the toss and elected to field.
- Rain prevented any further play.
- Mohammad Wasim (Pak) made his T20I debut.

=== 2nd T20I ===
31 July 2021
11:00
Scorecard

Pakistan; 157/8 (20 overs)	v	West Indies; 150/4 (20 overs)
Babar Azam 51 (40); Jason Holder 4/26 (4 overs)		Nicholas Pooran 62* (33); Mohammad Hafeez 1/6 (4 overs)

Pakistan won by 7 runs
Guyana National Stadium, Guyana
Umpires: Patrick Gustard (WI) and Leslie Reifer (WI)
Player of the match: Mohammad Hafeez (Pak)

- West Indies won the toss and elected to field.

=== 3rd T20I ===
1 August 2021
11:00
Scorecard

West Indies; 15/0 (1.2 overs)	v	Pakistan
Andre Fletcher 14* (6)

No result
Guyana National Stadium, Guyana
Umpires: Gregory Brathwaite (WI) and Joel Wilson (WI)

- West Indies won the toss and elected to bat.
- Rain during the West Indies' innings prevented any further play.

=== 4th T20I ===
3 August 2021
11:00
Scorecard

West Indies; 30/0 (3 overs)	v	Pakistan
Andre Fletcher 17* (12)

No result
Guyana National Stadium, Guyana
Umpires: Patrick Gustard (WI) and Leslie Reifer (WI)

- Pakistan won the toss and elected to field.
- Rain during the West Indies' innings prevented any further play.

== Test series ==
=== 1st Test ===
12–16 August 2021 (Note: While five days of play were scheduled for each Test, the first Test reached a result in four days.)
Scorecard

Pakistan	v	West Indies
217 (70.3 overs); Fawad Alam 56 (117); Jason Holder 3/26 (15.3 overs)		253 (89.4 overs); Kraigg Brathwaite 97 (221); Shaheen Afridi 4/59 (21.4 overs)
203 (83.4 overs); Babar Azam 55 (160); Jayden Seales 5/55 (15.4 overs)		168/9 (56.5 overs); Jermaine Blackwood 55 (78); Shaheen Afridi 4/50 (17 overs)

West Indies won by 1 wicket
Sabina Park, Jamaica
Umpires: Gregory Brathwaite (WI) and Joel Wilson (WI)
Player of the match: Jayden Seales (WI)

- West Indies won the toss and elected to field.
- Jayden Seales (WI) took his first five-wicket haul in Tests.
- World Test Championship points: West Indies 12, Pakistan 0.

An initially sunny first morning saw Kemar Roach and Jayden Seales dismiss the two Pakistani openers cheaply, but rain brought a halt to proceedings and an early lunch with the visitors on 34/2. West Indies' pace bowlers continued putting the Pakistan batsmen through difficult times after play resumed; removing Azhar Ali and Babar Azam within the space of five deliveries in the middle of an extended afternoon session. Tea came with Pakistan on a score of 123/5, but Fawad Alam and Faheem Ashraf built an 85-run partnership after the interval to bring their side to a more secure position, before Ashraf was run out as the pair attempted an unnecessary single. This effectively prompted a collapse from the tail end as the final five wickets fell for 31 runs in less than an hour.

The hosts went in to bat shortly after half past six, but Mohammad Abbas struck in the third over to remove Kieran Powell and Nkrumah Bonner, both for ducks, with successive deliveries. Bad light then brought the first day to a close with West Indies wobbling at 2/2. An overcast second day began with Abbas again questioning the batters with challenging line and length, but once nerves settled down, West Indies navigated to lunch with the loss of only one additional wicket, 81/3, with Kraigg Brathwaite unbeaten on 35. Brathwaite would go on to dominate the day, seeing off the bowlers throughout the next session, with the score 148/5 at the interval, and then marched towards a 96-run partnership with Jason Holder before the latter was dismissed. This was shortly followed by the departure of Brathwaite, run-out three runs shy of a century. Pakistan sought to exploit this opening, but wayward bowling with the new ball let the lower order squeeze out further runs, and a narrow lead, well before the umpires started worrying about light, with West Indies standing on 251/8 at stumps. Bright sunshine greeted the players on the next morning, but Shaheen Afridi quickly struck twice to get the home team's remaining wickets.

West Indies again removed one of the openers in quick order, but Azhar and Abid Ali settled for a 55-run second wicket, steadily progressing before Azhar was bowled in the final over before lunch, the visitors 56/2. The period after the resumption saw the home side's best moments of the day, as Seales removed Abid and Alam in quick succession, with Pakistan in a precarious position, four wickets down with a lead of only 29. Mohammad Rizwan and Babar Azam gradually added runs to this total, under darkening skies, which again forced an early interruption for tea, the visitors now at 117/4. After the delay, Rizwan's wicket quickly fell to Holder's bowling, but Azam saw out the day's play, reaching a half century in the company of Faheem Ashraf, the scoreboard reading 160/5. This put West Indies in the position of requiring a strong performance to restrict the chase to a manageable total. This was achieved the following morning with the help of a tight spell by Seales, who become the youngest West Indies bowler to record a five-wicket haul in Test cricket, breaking Alf Valentine's record, with Pakistan's last five wickets falling for 35 runs, 28 of those coming from batting by Hasan Ali.

The dramatic session saw three more wickets, the first one of those in a surprising over which saw three reviews for lbw appeals, Kieran Powell finally falling to Afridi's bowling on the third. Brathwaite and Bonner were next, each out for single-figure scores to Afridi. Jermaine Blackwood and Roston Chase successfully limited the damage, with the hosts on 38/3 at the break of play. Faheem Ashraf then put further pressure on the batsmen, getting an edge from Chase and then from Kyle Mayers in his next over, but the more important moments for the visitors came late in the session, with the wickets of Blackwood and Holder reducing the hosts to 114/7, the remaining 54 runs looking like a tall order for the tail. However, as in Antigua in 2000, the lower order stood up to the task, and despite best efforts by Pakistan, including a stunning catch by wicket-keeper Rizwan for the ninth wicket, the score at 151/9, the final pair saw out the remaining 17 required runs, giving the West Indies a single-wicket victory on a see-sawing fourth (and final) day. Seales was named player of the match for his performance with the ball, having taken eight wickets.

=== 2nd Test ===
20–24 August 2021
Scorecard

Pakistan	v	West Indies
302/9d (110 overs); Fawad Alam 124* (213); Jayden Seales 3/31 (15 overs)		150 (51.3 overs); Nkrumah Bonner 37 (116); Shaheen Afridi 6/51 (17.3 overs)
176/6d (27.2 overs); Imran Butt 37 (44); Alzarri Joseph 2/24 (4.2 overs)		219 (83.2 overs); Jason Holder 47 (83); Shaheen Afridi 4/43 (17.2 overs)

Pakistan won by 109 runs
Sabina Park, Jamaica
Umpires: Gregory Brathwaite (WI) and Joel Wilson (WI)
Player of the match: Shaheen Afridi (Pak)

- West Indies won the toss and elected to field.
- No play was possible on day 2 due to rain.
- World Test Championship points: Pakistan 12, West Indies 0.

The first overs of the game were a setback for the Pakistan team, as Kemar Roach and Jayden Seales took the first three wickets in short order for only two runs. However, Babar Azam and Fawad Alam built an unbeaten century partnership, bringing Pakistan to 62/3 at lunch and 145/3 at tea. The weather conditions in which the match was played, having previously forced off West Indies wicket-keeper Joshua Da Silva (replaced by the reserve wicket-keeper, Jahmar Hamilton) with cramps, ultimately led to Alam retiring hurt, suffering from the same condition, his stand with Azam still unbeaten on 158. Azam was out later in the final session, caught in the slips off Roach. Mohammad Rizwan and Faheem Ashraf saw off the remainder of the day, under less oppressive weather, with the visitors reaching the close on 212/4, only 74 overs having been bowled before bad light prevented further play. Rain and a consequently wet outfield prevented any play the following day. Damp patches in the bowler's run-up further hampered play the following morning, only eight balls being possible before lunch. On the resumption, things began slowly as Pakistan only scored 6 runs in the first 10 overs. Rizwan and Ashraf would end up with a 50 partnership, but the star of the day was Alam, who, having retired hurt earlier, returned and guided his team through the day's play, on the way to an unbeaten 124, with Pakistan on 273/8 at tea. A declaration a few overs after the interval put the home side in the bat for the rest of the session.

Ideal bowling conditions put the batsmen immediately on the backfoot, with both openers departing for single figure scores within the first six overs. The wicket of Chase was next to fall, and with deteriorating light, Alzarri Joseph was sent in as nightwatchman, preventing any further damage, the hosts on 39/3 at the close, and the visitors firmly in control. Afridi struck early the next morning, removing Joseph, but Jermaine Blackwood and Nkrumah Bonner put on some resistance before Abbas removed Bonner and then Mayers, who had yet to score in the series. Afridi, on his way to a 6-wicket haul, then had Blackwood out to a short delivery, and West Indies, without any established batters remaining, were 123/8 at lunch. Jason Holder aggressively targeted Abbas' bowling after the break, hitting multiple boundaries, but Afridi eventually struck twice more.

Pakistan then went out to bat, and, recognising that time was in short supply if they were to force a result, brought about 107/3 in the 17 overs that were possible before tea. The evening did not bring any break to the onslaught, as the runs kept tallying up. Another declaration left 90 minutes until the close.

The opening partnership, batting cautiously, held up for over an hour, but was undone by Powell being run out. Joseph was brought in as a nightwatchman again, and no further wicket fell until stumps, with the score 49/1. This left Pakistan in need of 9 wickets, and West Indies requiring still 280, with the former looking a far more likely prospect. Joseph and Brathwaite kept the bowlers waiting on the final morning as they made steady progress, but once Afridi had Joseph, Hasan Ali and Nauman Ali combined for a few of the middle order wickets, leaving West Indies 113/5 at lunch. Blackwood and Brathwaite then seemed to get the situation under control, but Nauman removed the former with a well-flighted delivery. A poor shot by Brathwaite then allowed Pakistan to take aim at the lower order, although Mayers put on a stout display, falling to Afridi just before rain brought an early tea, the scoreboard now reading 159/7, the visitors just three wickets from leveling the series. The weather only briefly delayed the match, although West Indies continued resisting, this time with the help of Holder, dismissed by Nauman Ali three runs from a half-century. Afridi took up the new ball shortly thereafter, and, on his way to a ten-wicket haul, quickly worked through the tail to bring victory to his side. He was named player of the match for his bowling.
