= Hal Hooker =

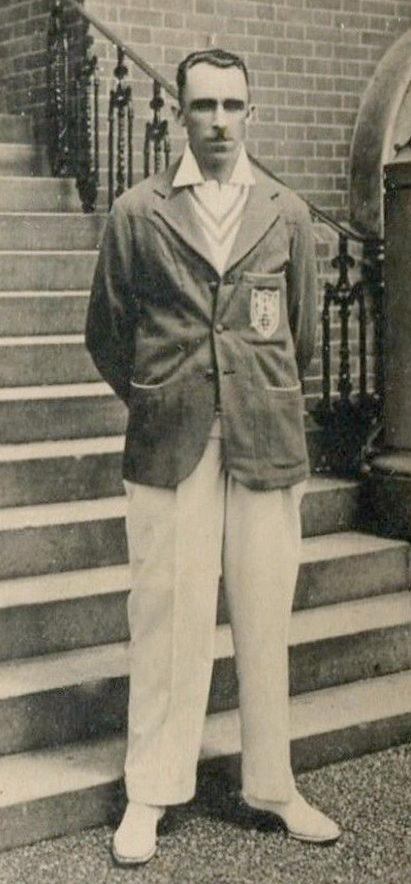
- Hooker on a 1928 cigarette card

Personal information
- Full name: John Edward Halford Hooker
- Born: 6 March 1898; Summer Hill, New South Wales, Australia
- Died: 12 February 1982 (aged 83); Winmalee, New South Wales, Australia
- Batting: Right-handed
- Bowling: Right-arm fast medium
- Role: Bowler

Domestic team information
- Years: Team
- 1924/25–1931/32: New South Wales

Career statistics
Competition	First-class
Matches	23
Runs scored	421
Batting average	20.04
100s/50s	0/3
Top score	62
Balls bowled	5,857
Wickets	87
Bowling average	28.50
5 wickets in innings	4
10 wickets in match	1
Best bowling	6/42
Catches/stumpings	12/–
- Source: CricketArchive, 8 January 2008

John Edward Halford "Hal" Hooker (6 March 1898 – 12 February 1982) was an Australian first class cricketer who played for New South Wales. A tall fast-medium bowler, he stood at 6 ft and was capable of swinging the ball both ways.

In 1928/29 he became the first player to take four wickets in successive balls in a Sheffield Shield match.

He is the holder of the world record 10th wicket stand in first class cricket, making 307 with Alan Kippax. Coming in at number 11, Hooker batted for almost five hours and made 62.

After retiring from cricket Hooker became a sports broadcaster. In 1946, he was reporting for the BBC Light Programme on the 1946–47 Ashes series.
