= Single (cricket) =

In cricket, a single is scored when the batsman take one run, either following a successful shot (with the run attributed to the on-strike batsman) or when running for a bye or leg bye (counted as an extra).

Unlike when a boundary is hit (and the run are scored even if the batsmen don't leave their creases), scoring a single requires the batsmen to physically run between the wickets. This introduces the risk of being run out, so effective communication between the batsmen is vital. If one batsman attempts to run and the other stays put, then a humiliating run out is likely, but quick and well attuned batsmen may be able to run "quick singles" when other batsmen would not. In general, singles are much easier to score when the field is set further out, but bringing more fielders in makes it easier for the on-strike batsman to hit boundaries.

Singles usually rotate the strike in a partnership, but because the bowling end changes at the end of an over, singles deliberately only taken at the end of an over are used by quality batsmen to keep the strike when they are batting with the tail-enders, who are unlikely to survive for long against quality bowling and whom an experienced batsman will normally try to protect.

== See also ==
- Single (baseball)
