= Kippax Fair Shopping Centre =

Australian shopping centre in Canberra

Kippax Fair
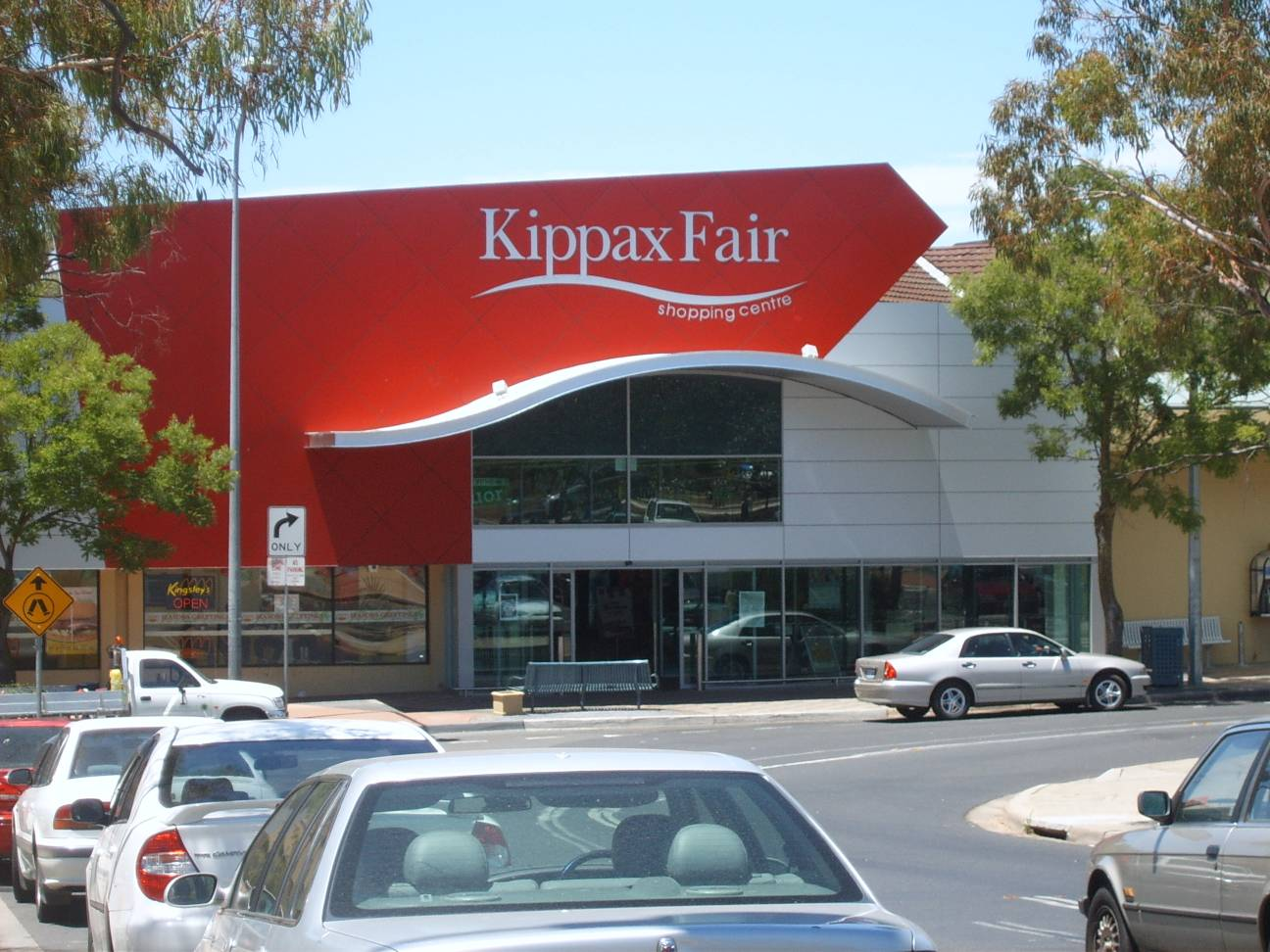
- View from Hardwick Crescent
- Location: Hardwick Crescent, Holt, Australian Capital Territory
- Coordinates: 35°13′21″S 149°01′12″E
- Opened: March 1976; 50 years ago
- Owner: LJ Hooker
- Num. of stores: 59
- Num. of anchor tenants: 2
- Floor area: 128,195 m^{2} (1,379,880 sq ft)
- Floors: 1
- Parking: 300 +/-
- Website: kippaxfair.com.au

Kippax Fair is a shopping centre in the western Canberra suburb of Holt, Australian Capital Territory, Australia. Named after cricketer Alan Kippax, it serves the West Belconnen region, and is anchored by a Woolworths Supermarket, an Aldi discount supermarket, and other stores, restaurants, cafeterias, bars, and community services.

== History ==
In 1974, as the region of West Belconnen was slowly emerging, an approach was made by the ACT Government to build a sizeable shopping centre on a large plot of land neighbouring the Parkwood industrial estate. Its original design was to encompass one indoor shopping complex and two outdoor strip malls, now housing the majority of the centre's north-eastern wing. It opened in March 1976.

In the late 1980s, with the area population growing steadily and competition arising from the newly opened Belconnen Mall (now Westfield Belconnen), development began on the area now housing Woolworths, as well as building another strip mall on Kippax Place, including a Caltex service station and the West Belconnen Leagues Club. This was furthered in 2005 when an expansion was made to house Aldi, and a completely separate building was developed next to the centre's playground to house the Kippax Public Library. The centre's facade was also modernised.

In early 2019, a master plan was developed by the ACT Government, showing intent to expand the centre on the Kippax Playing Fields. This expansion would include another indoor shopping complex, housing another anchor tenant and a further range of stores. This plan was amidst controversy as it would force local sporting organisations to move their training facilities to other locations, such as the Higgins Oval, about 2 km (1.2 mi) to the centre's south.

== Gallery ==
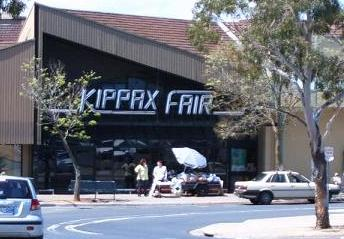
The original façade stood until 2005

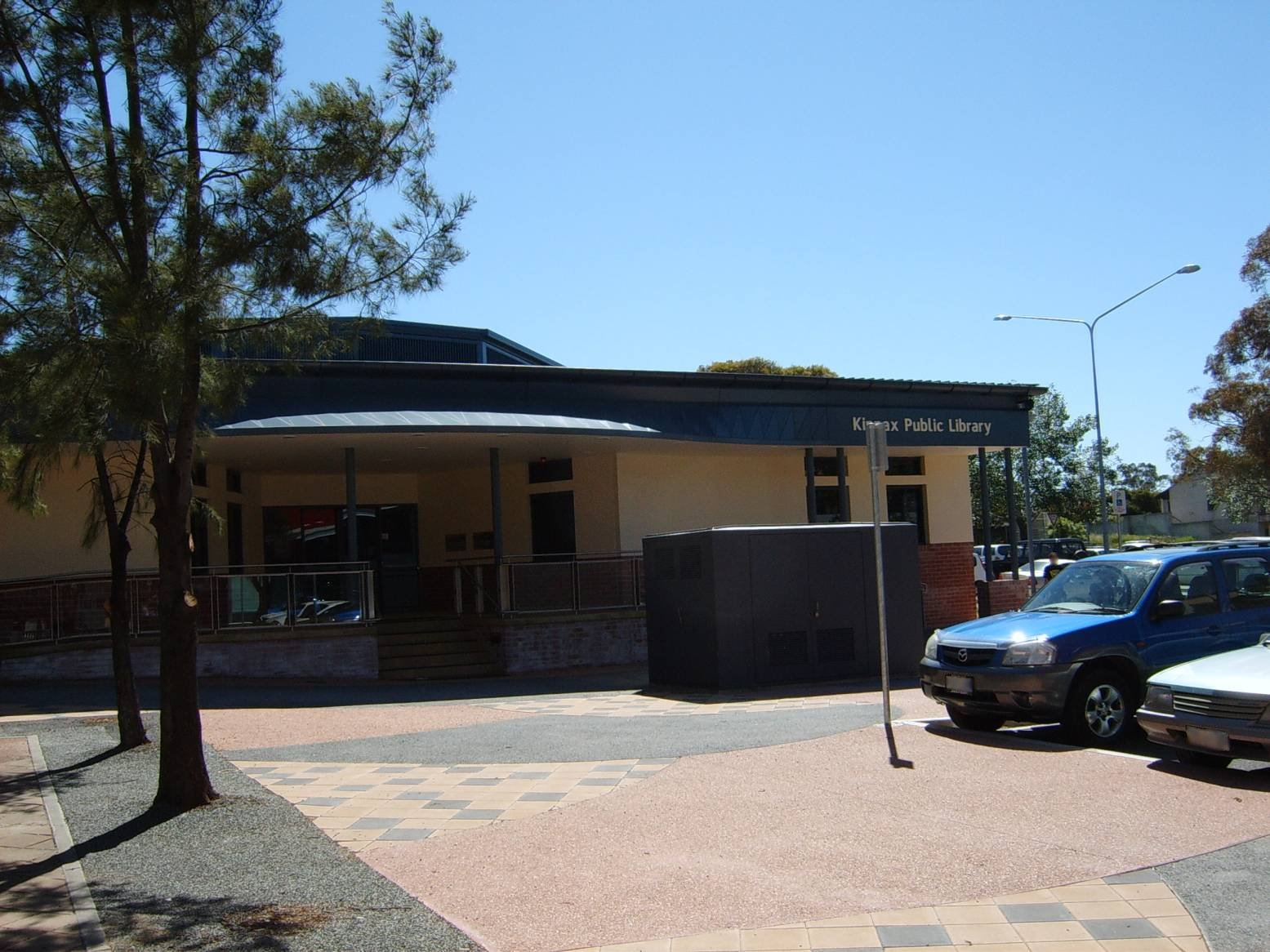
The Kippax Public Library
