= Macgregor, Australian Capital Territory =

Macgregor
- Suburb
- Coordinates: 35°12′39″S 149°00′55″E
- Country: Australia
- State: Australian Capital Territory
- City: Canberra
- District: Belconnen
- Established: 1972

Government
  - Territory electorate: Ginninderra
  - Federal division: Fenner

Area
  - Total: 4.3 km^{2} (1.7 sq mi)

Population
  - Total: 7,049 (SAL 2021)
- Postcode: 2615
Suburbs around Macgregor
| Dunlop | Charnwood |
| Macgregor | Latham |
| Holt | Holt |

Macgregor (/məkˈɡrɛɡə/) is a residential suburb in the Belconnen district of Canberra, located within the Australian Capital Territory, Australia. It was gazetted on 9 September 1971. It lies next to the suburbs of Dunlop, Latham and Holt on the western side of Belconnen, with Florey Drive the boundary to the east, Ginninderra Drive on the north, and Southern Cross Drive on the south.

The suburb of Macgregor is named after Sir William MacGregor, Governor of Queensland 1909–14 and first chancellor of the University of Queensland, 1911. Streets are named after members of the Australian medical professions.

== Facilities and location ==
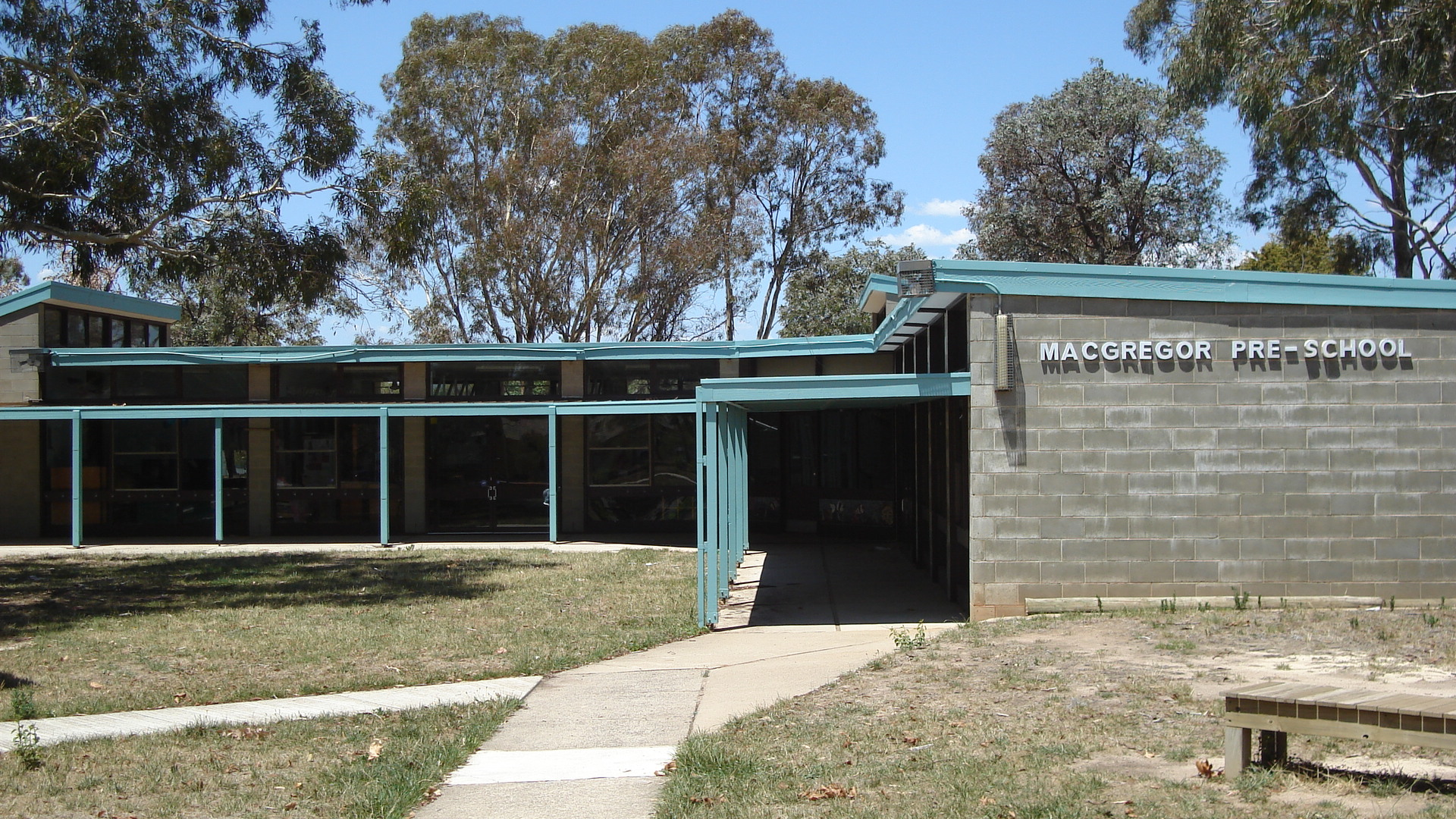
Macgregor pre-school.

Macgregor has a primary school and neighbourhood oval. The main road in the suburb is Osburn Drive, which passes by a shop (formerly a petrol station) and an area that was formerly a small shopping centre – this has now been demolished and redeveloped into Kings swimming pool.

Macgregor is primarily situated on Mount Goodwin (612 metres (2,008 ft)). Ginninderra Creek runs through the middle of the suburb for 1.4 kilometres (0.87 mi).

== Governance ==
For the purposes of Australian federal elections for the House of Representatives, Macgregor is in Fenner.

For the purposes of Australian Capital Territory elections for the ACT Legislative Assembly, Macgregor is in the Ginninderra electorate.

== Geology ==
Silurian age Deakin Volcanics purple rhyodacite covers the suburb.

== Demographics ==
At the 2016 census, the suburb of Macgregor recorded a population of 6,796 people. Of these:

- Age distribution: Residents had a slight over-representation of young families compared to the country overall. The median age was 32 years, compared to the national median of 38 years. Children aged under 15 years made up 24.4% of the population (national average is 18.7%) and people aged 65 years and over made up 8.2% of the population (national average is 15.7%).
- Ethnic diversity : 72.0% were born in Australia, higher than the national average of 66.7%; the next most common countries of birth were India 3.2%, England 2.9%, China 1.9%, Philippines 1.6% and New Zealand 1.3%. At home, 74.3% of residents only spoke English; the next most common languages spoken at home were Mandarin 2.2%, Punjabi 1.6%, Hindi 1.4%, Bengali 1.1% and Tagalog 1.0%.
- Housing: The average household size was 2.7 people. Most (81.6%) occupied private dwellings were separate houses, 18.0% were semi-detached (row or terrace houses, townhouses etc.), and 0.4% were flats, units or apartments.
- Religion: The most common religious affiliation was "No Religion" (34.8%); the next most common responses were Catholic 23.0%, Anglican 10.5% and Islam 3.4%.

== Gallery ==
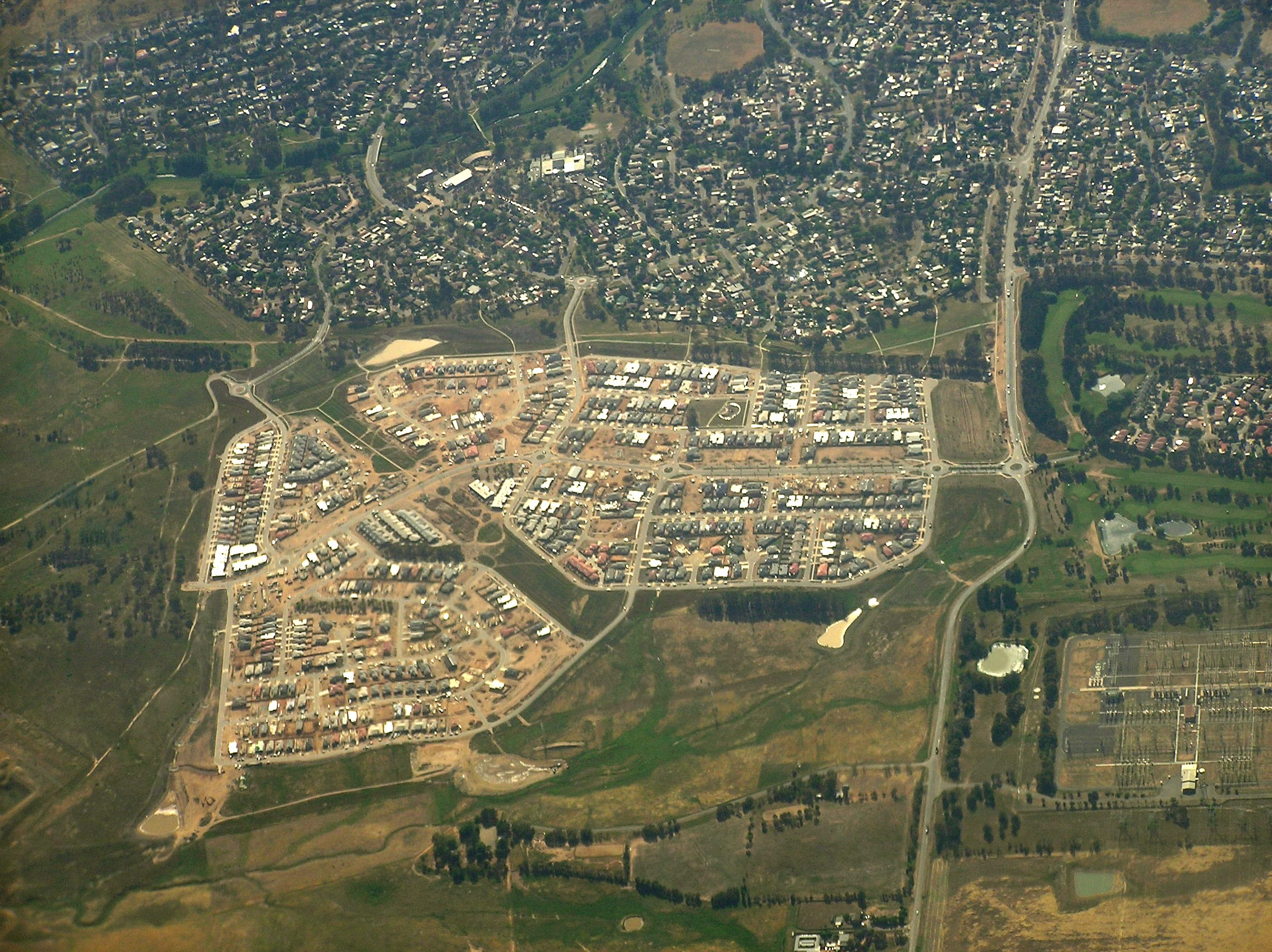
Aerial view from the west showing the new part.

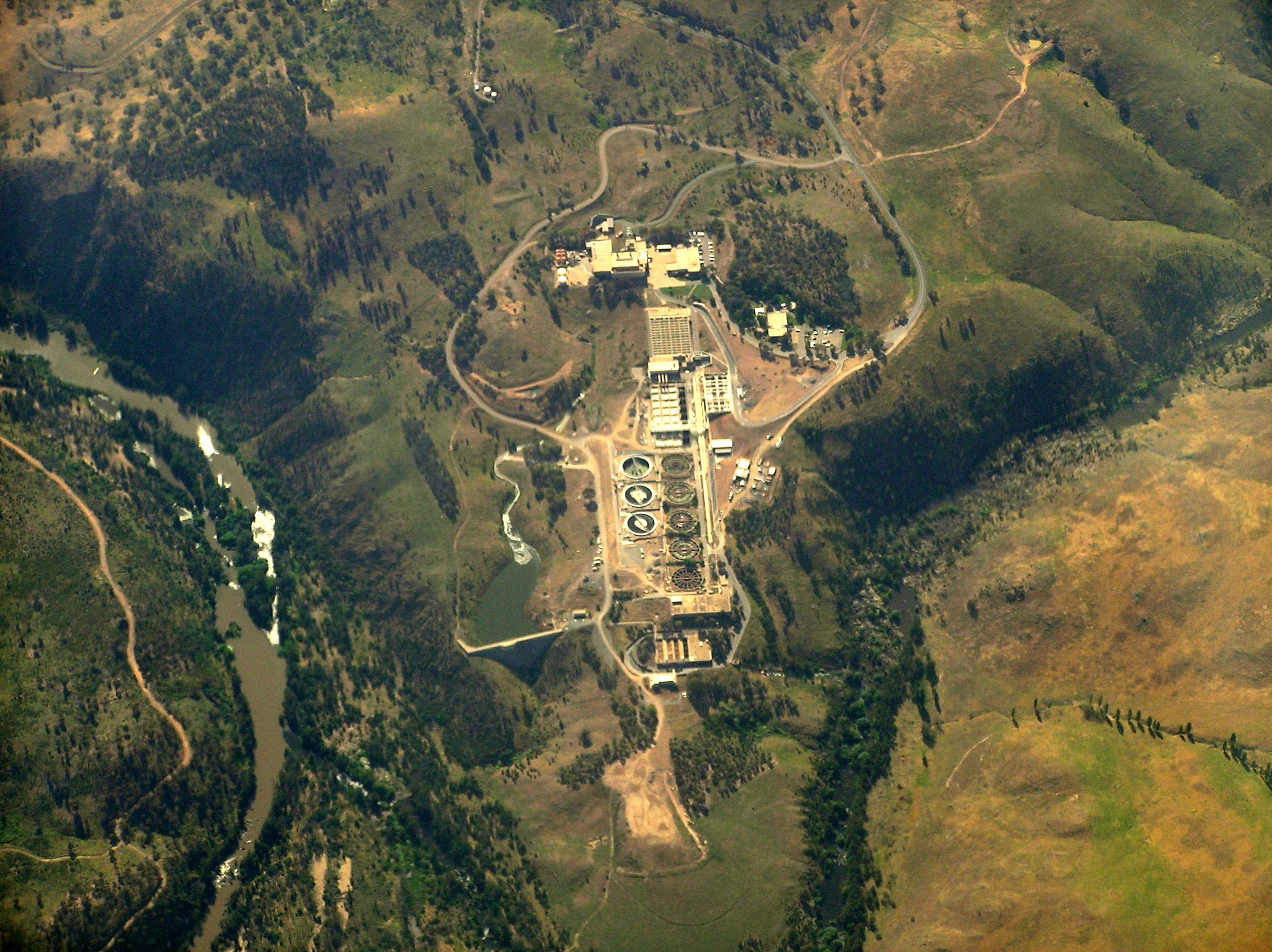
Sewage is handled nearby at the treatment works.
