= Fawad Alam =

Pakistani cricketer

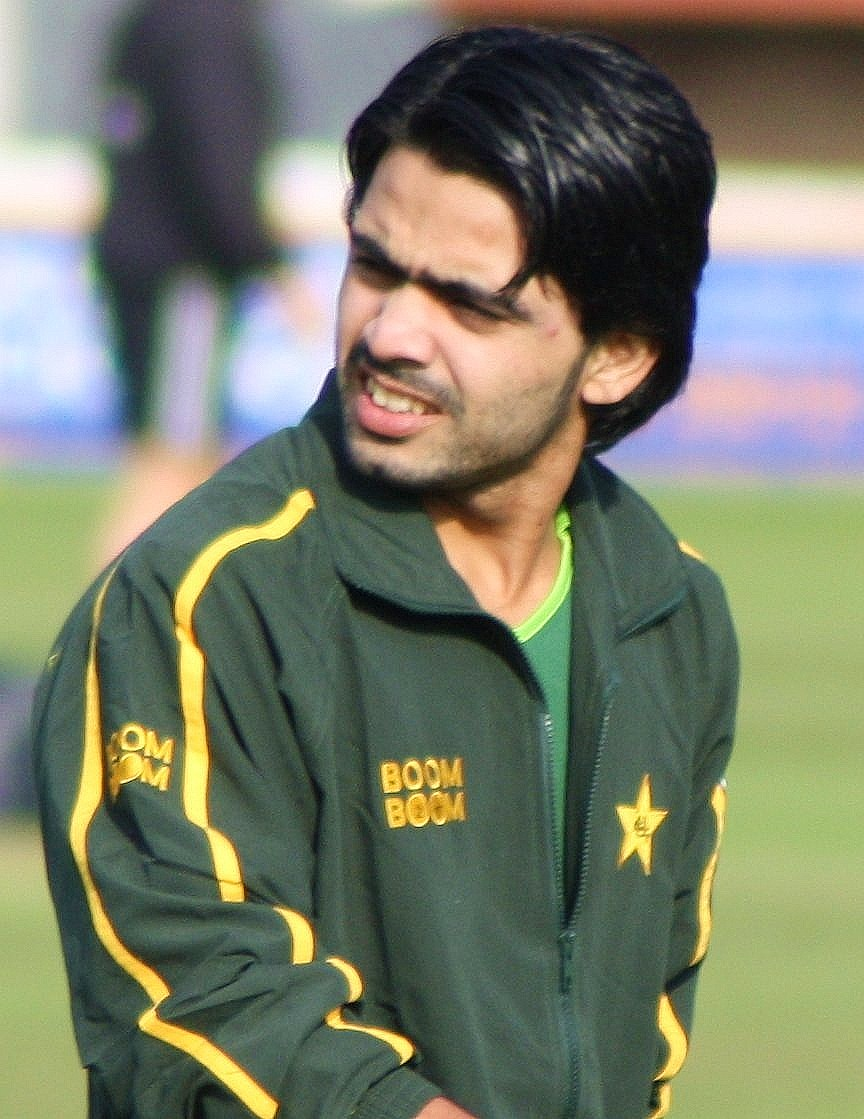
- Fawad in 2010

Personal information
- Full name: Fawad Tariq Alam
- Born: 8 October 1985 (age 41); Karachi, Sindh, Pakistan
- Height: 1.74 m (5 ft 9 in)
- Batting: Left-handed
- Bowling: Slow left-arm orthodox
- Role: Top-order batter
- Relatives: Tariq Alam (father); Mansoor Akhtar (father-in-law); Waheed Mirza (uncle); Usman Afzaal (cousin)

International information
- National side: Pakistan (2007–2022)
- Test debut (cap 196): 12 July 2009 v Sri Lanka
- Last Test: 24 July 2022 v Sri Lanka
- ODI debut (cap 156): 22 May 2007 v Sri Lanka
- Last ODI: 22 April 2015 v Bangladesh
- ODI shirt no.: 25
- T20I debut (cap 20): 4 September 2007 v Kenya
- Last T20I: 26 December 2010 v New Zealand
- T20I shirt no.: 25

Domestic team information
- Years: Team
- 2003–2006: Pakistan Customs
- 2004-2015: Karachi Dolphins
- 2006–2007: Karachi Harbour
- 2006–2015/16: National Bank of Pakistan
- 2012–2013: Duronto Rajshahi
- 2016: Karachi Kings
- 2016–present: Karachi Blues
- 2016/17–2017/18: Sui Southern Gas Company
- 2019–present: Sindh

Career statistics
Competition	Test	ODI	FC	LA
Matches	19	38	205	208
Runs scored	1,011	966	14,788	6,654
Batting average	38.88	40.25	55.38	47.87
100s/50s	5/2	1/6	43/73	8/40
Top score	168	114*	296*	149
Balls bowled	96	398	5,380	4,386
Wickets	2	5	60	91
Bowling average	27.00	75.40	42.21	40.10
5 wickets in innings	0	0	0	1
10 wickets in match	0	0	0	0
Best bowling	2/46	1/8	4/27	5/53
Catches/stumpings	13/–	10/–	111/–	83/–
- Source: ESPNcricinfo, 19 Nov 2024

Fawad Tariq Alam (Urdu: فواد عالم, born 8 October 1985) is a Pakistani cricketer and actor who plays for Sindh and the Pakistan national cricket team. He made his international debut for Pakistan in May 2007. He returned to Pakistan's Test team after a gap of 88 Tests and more than 10 years, the second longest gap by a Pakistani in Test cricket after Younis Ahmed's 104 Tests gap. He was surprisingly overlooked for selection to the Pakistan test cricket team for over a decade despite being a prolific run scorer in domestic first-class matches. With respect to career batting average, Fawad is among the all-time top 50 batsmen in first-class cricket worldwide; he is the sole Pakistani on the list.

Born in Karachi, Fawad plays primarily as a left-handed batter, but also bowls slow left-arm orthodox. After not playing international cricket for more than 10 years for Pakistan, he returned to Test cricket against England, in August 2020. He is also known for his Ertuğrul Gazi-type signature style celebration, which he emulated from the Turkish historical drama series Diriliş: Ertuğrul.

== Early life and family ==
Fawad comes from a cricketing family and was born to a Pakistani first-class cricketer, Tariq Alam. His paternal uncle, Rafat Alam, and his maternal uncle, Waheed Mirza, played first-class cricket for Pakistan. He is also a cousin of the English Test cricketer, Usman Afzaal.

In November 2011, Fawad married the daughter of former Pakistan Test cricketer, Mansoor Akhtar in Karachi.

== Career ==
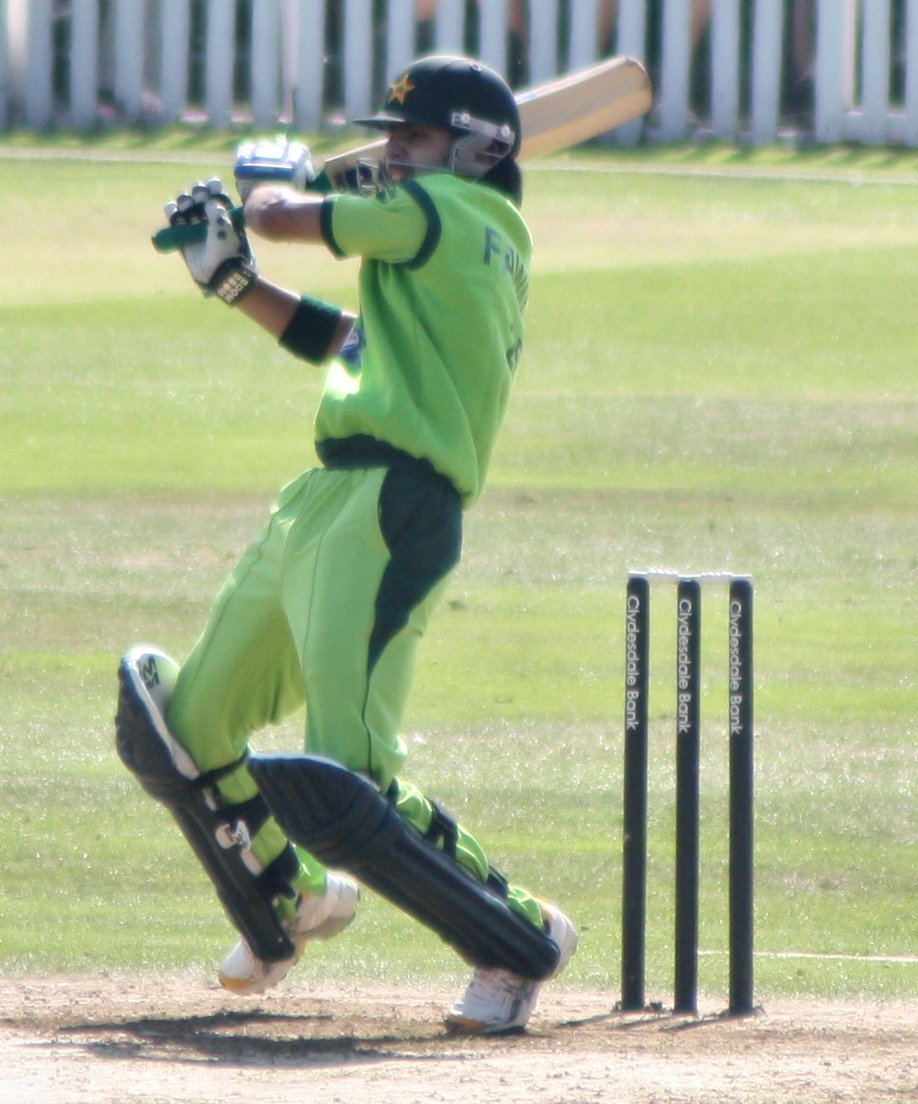
Fawad batting against Somerset during the 2010 tour of England.

After Pakistan's disappointing 2007 Cricket World Cup, Fawad was drafted into a 16-man squad for a One Day International (ODI) series against Sri Lanka in Abu Dhabi. On debut, he was out for a first ball duck. His second ODI was a better experience as he contributed 32 unbeaten runs down the order as Pakistan beat India by 31 runs in Jaipur.

In between those two matches, Fawad travelled to South Africa as part of Pakistan's squad for the 2007 ICC World Twenty20 tournament. He played in the semi-final, taking two wickets against New Zealand, as Pakistan progressed to the final, for which he was not selected. In the Asia Cup, in June 2008, he scored his maiden international half century against Hong Kong. He was subsequently dropped for the Sri Lanka series in January 2009.

In October 2008, Fawad was selected for the quadrangular Twenty20 International tournament to be played in Canada between Sri Lanka, Pakistan, Zimbabwe and hosts Canada. In the fourth match of the tournament, he hit 23 not out from just eight balls with three sixes and took a wicket. In the next match against Zimbabwe, he took three wickets for seven runs from 3 overs.

=== 2010 ===
Fawad was picked to tour England in 2010. He played club cricket in England to help himself get used to the conditions. Fawad scored well in the first two matches but his major breakthrough came in the third ODI when he increased his top score to 64. He retained his place for the ODI series against South Africa in the UAE. After scoring 123 runs in the five-match series, he was subsequently dropped from the ODI team and later that year, lost his place in the T20 team after the tour to New Zealand.

=== Asia Cup 2014: Return ===
After being dropped from all formats for three and a half years, Fawad's impressive displays domestically (most notably being the top run scorer in the President's One Day Trophy in the season 2013/14) earned him a recall to the national side for the Asia Cup in 2014. His first match after his recall was against the host team Bangladesh, deputising for the injured Sharjeel Khan. He contributed significantly to the team's victory, scoring 74 runs from 70 balls in a competitive chase of 326. He continued his form by scoring his maiden international ODI hundred (114 not out) against Sri Lanka in the final, rescuing his side from 18/3 to 260/5 with the help of Misbah-ul-Haq and Umar Akmal. His effort was not enough though as Sri Lanka successfully chased the target to become the champions of the 2014 Asia Cup.

=== 2017 onwards ===
In 2017, Fawad signed to play as a professional for Clitheroe Cricket Club in the Lancashire League. In April 2018, he was named the vice-captain of Sindh's squad for the 2018 Pakistan Cup. In March 2019, he was named in Baluchistan's squad for the 2019 Pakistan Cup.

In September 2019, Fawad was named in Sindh's squad for the 2019–20 Quaid-e-Azam Trophy tournament.

=== Test career ===
In July 2009, Fawad became the first Pakistani cricketer to score a Test century on debut away from home, and the tenth to score a century on debut, scoring 168 runs in the second innings of the second Test against Sri Lanka. In a partnership of 200 runs with captain Younus Khan for the second wicket, the pair broke the previous record of 151 runs between Mohsin Khan and Majid Khan at Lahore in 1981–82. It was also highest partnership for Pakistan against Sri Lanka in Sri Lanka. However, just two Test matches later, he was dropped from the team.

In December 2019, after a gap of more than ten years, Fawad was named in Pakistan's Test squad, for the two-match home series against Sri Lanka. He received his call-up to national test side after his consistent performances at first-class level and by the time he received a call-up after a gap of over a decade, he had already scored over 8000 runs with 26 centuries and with a stellar average of 56.48 in first-class cricket. In June 2020, he was named in a 29-man squad for Pakistan's tour to England during the COVID-19 pandemic. In July 2020, he was shortlisted in Pakistan's 20-man squad for the Test matches against England. In August 2020, Fawad played in the second Test against England, after a gap of 10 years and 258 days since his last Test match appearance. In the first innings, he faced four balls before being dismissed for a duck.

In December 2020, Fawad was named in Pakistan's Test squad for their away series against New Zealand. In the first Test, he scored his first Test hundred after more than 11 years, a gap of 4,218 days between the two. It was the longest period only behind after Warren Bardsley's 5,093 and Syed Mushtaq Ali's 4,544 days. He also emulated Ertugrul Gazi's popular celebration style which he copied from one of the popular scenes which featured in the 2014 Turkish drama series Diriliş: Ertuğrul after scoring a test century against New Zealand.

In January 2021, Fawad was named in Pakistan's 17 man Test squad for their home series against South Africa. In the 1st Test, Fawad scored 109, sharing a century partnership with Faheem Ashraf.

On 30 April 2021, Fawad became the first Asian cricketer to convert his first four test 50s into 100s. He achieved this milestone during the first Test match against Zimbabwe. In August 2021, he continued his fine form further by scoring another century during the second test against West Indies at Sabina Park. He also became the fastest Pakistani as well as fastest Asian batsman to reach five Test centuries in term of innings (22) surpassing the previous record of 24 innings held by India's Cheteshwar Pujara.

== Television ==
Year	Show	Channel	Note
2019	Ghar Damad	PTV	Acting debut with a cameo in a comedy-drama sitcom
2021	Khudkash Muhabbat	UrduFlix	Lead role
2022-2023	The Ultimate Muqabla	ARY Digital	Adventure-action reality show
