= Overthrow (cricket) =

Type of run scored in cricket

In cricket, an overthrow (sometimes called a buzzer) is an additional run scored by a batter as a result of the ball not being collected by a fielder in the centre, having been thrown in from the outfield. Overthrows usually occur when a fielder aims unsuccessfully at the stumps in an attempt to run out a batter, although sometimes they are due to handling errors by the fielder receiving the ball.

Runs scored in this manner are counted in addition to any runs already scored before the fielding error took place, and are credited to the batter. If the ball reaches the boundary as a result of an overthrow then the four runs for the boundary are added to the number of completed runs before the overthrow, which can lead to the unusual event of a batter scoring more than six (or exactly five) runs off a single ball. It is considered an overthrow run if a ball hits a wicket while the batter is inside the popping crease and then the batter runs.

There have been at least four instances in Test cricket of eight runs being scored off a single ball. The most recent was by Andrew Symonds for Australia against New Zealand at Brisbane in November 2008, when the batters managed to run four runs before the ball was thrown back over the wicket keeper's head for a four-run boundary.

It is possible for the ball to be thrown over more than once from the same delivery, leading to even more runs being scored. In theory, there is therefore no limit to how many runs may be scored off a single ball.

== Deflections ==
A throw that deflects off the batsman or bat and goes to the boundary is sometimes also considered an overthrow. A notable incidence of this was in the 2019 Cricket World Cup Final, where six runs were scored off a deflection from Ben Stokes' bat. A similar incident repeated in the first test of the New Zealand tour of England in 2022, with the throw deflecting off Stokes' bat at the same venue (Lord's) and with the ball being bowled by the same bowler, Trent Boult, only the ball not going to the boundary.
