= Tariq Alam =

Pakistani cricketer (born 1956)

Personal information
- Batting: Right-handed
- Bowling: Right-arm off-break
- Relatives: Fawad Alam (son)

Career statistics
Competition	First-class	List A
Matches	109	64
Runs scored	5,209	965
Batting average	34.26	23.53
100s/50s	4/34	0/4
Top score	125*	70*
Balls bowled	3,571	749
Wickets	41	17
Bowling average	44.00	42.70
5 wickets in innings	0	0
10 wickets in match	0	0
Best bowling	4/40	4/12
Catches/stumpings	72/1	20/–
- Source: CricketArchive, 13 August 2020

Tariq Alam (born 30 May 1956) is a former Pakistani first-class cricketer. He played for the House Building Finance Corporation cricket team from 1978/79 until 1993/94. His son Fawad Alam, is a Test and ODI cricketer for Pakistan.
