= Pakistani cricket team in the West Indies in 2000 =

The Pakistan national cricket team toured the West Indies from April to May 2000 and played a three-match Test series against the West Indies cricket team which the West Indies won 1–0. Pakistan were captained by Moin Khan; West Indies by Jimmy Adams. In addition, the teams played in the 2000 Cable & Wireless ODI Series, a triangular Limited Overs International (LOI) tournament, along with Zimbabwe. Pakistan and West Indies reached the Finals, a three-match series which Pakistan won 2–1.

== Test series summary ==
=== First Test ===
5–9 May 2000
(5-day match)
Scorecard

Pakistan	v	West Indies
288 (123.3 overs); Inzamam-ul-Haq 135 (254); CEL Ambrose 4/43 (25.3 overs)		227/7 (87 overs); S Chanderpaul 46* (172); NAM McLean 46 (95); Mushtaq Ahmed 3/91 (32 overs)

Match drawn
Bourda, Georgetown, Guyana
Umpires: SA Bucknor (WI) and RE Koertzen (SA)
Player of the match: Inzamam-ul-Haq (PAK)

- West Indies won the toss and elected to field.
- There was no play on the fourth and fifth days.

=== Second Test ===
18–22 May 2000
(5-day match)
Scorecard

Pakistan	v	West Indies
253 (86 overs); Mohammad Yousuf 115 (235); CA Walsh 5/22 (13 overs)		398 (139 overs); WW Hinds 165 (236); Saqlain Mushtaq 5/121 (51 overs)
419/9d (153.4 overs); Imran Nazir 131 (180); RD King 4/82 (29 overs)		132/4 (52 overs); WW Hinds 52 (112); Mushtaq Ahmed 2/64 (20 overs)

Match drawn
Kensington Oval, Bridgetown, Barbados
Umpires: RE Koertzen (SA) and EA Nicholls (WI)
Player of the match: WW Hinds (WI)

- Pakistan won the toss and elected to bat.
- RR Sarwan (WI) made his Test debut.

=== Third Test ===
25–29 May 2000
(5-day match)
Scorecard

Pakistan	v	West Indies
269 (91 overs); Mohammad Yousuf 103* (231); CA Walsh 5/83 (26 overs)		273 (106.2 overs); S Chanderpaul 89 (218); Wasim Akram 6/61 (26.2 overs)
219 (90 overs); Inzamam-ul-Haq 68 (124); RD King 4/48 (23 overs)		216/9 (91 overs); WW Hinds 63 (129); Wasim Akram 5/49 (30 overs)

West Indies won by 1 wicket
Antigua Recreation Ground, St. John's, Antigua and Barbuda
Umpires: DB Cowie (NZ) and BR Doctrove (WI)
Player of the match: Wasim Akram (PAK)

- West Indies won the toss and elected to field.
