= Mansoor Akhtar =

Pakistani former cricketer

Personal information
- Born: 25 December 1957 (age 68); Karachi, Federal Capital Territory, Pakistan
- Batting: Right-handed
- Bowling: Right-arm off spin
- Role: All-rounder
- Relatives: Fawad Alam (son-in-law)

International information
- National side: Pakistan
- Test debut (cap 86): 24 November 1980 v West Indies
- Last Test: 12 January 1990 v Australia
- ODI debut (cap 29): 21 November 1980 v West Indies
- Last ODI: 3 January 1990 v Australia

Domestic team information
- Years: Team
- 1974/75–1990/91: Karachi Whites
- 1975/76–1997/98: Karachi Blues
- 1976/77–1978/79: Sind
- 1978/79–1996/97: United Bank Limited
- 1988/89–1990/91: Karachi

Career statistics
Competition	Test	ODI	FC	LA
Matches	19	41	240	183
Runs scored	655	593	13,804	5,445
Batting average	25.19	17.44	37.71	35.35
100s/50s	1/3	0/0	28/69	4/37
Top score	111	47	224*	153*
Balls bowled	–	138	2,536	1,204
Wickets	–	2	37	25
Bowling average	–	55.00	37.83	40.24
5 wickets in innings	–	0	0	0
10 wickets in match	–	0	0	0
Best bowling	–	1/7	3/24	3/25
Catches/stumpings	9/–	14/–	167/2	53/–
- Source: CricInfo, 19 September 2011

Mansoor Akhtar (born 25 December 1957) is a Pakistani former cricketer who played in 19 Test matches and 41 One Day Internationals between 1980 and 1990. In his Test career Mansoor scored one century and three half-centuries, with a highest score of 111 against Australia in Faisalabad. In his ODI career he failed to even record a half century and took only two wickets.

At the age of only 19 he partnered Waheed Mirza in a world record opening stand of 561 on 7 and 8 February 1977 while playing for Karachi Whites against Quetta at National Stadium, Karachi. The partnership is still the best for the first wicket in first-class cricket, and took just six and a half hours.

On 7 August 2019, Mansoor Akhtar, along with one other person named Ramesh Gupta from India, was alleged to have approached Pakistani cricketer Umar Akmal for match fixing during the second edition of the Global T20 Canada tournament. Akmal, however, reported the approach to the Pakistan Cricket Board and tournament officials. Anti-corruption officials instructed all participating teams to stay away from Akhtar and Ramesh Gupta. Mansoor Akhtar has admitted meeting Umar Akmal, but hasn't admitted to the allegations of fixing.
