= Holt, Australian Capital Territory =

Holt
- Suburb
- Coordinates: 35°13′27″S 149°00′55″E
- Country: Australia
- State: Australian Capital Territory
- City: Canberra
- District: Belconnen
- Established: 1972

Government
  - Territory electorate: Ginninderra
  - Federal division: Fenner

Area
  - Total: 3.3 km^{2} (1.3 sq mi)

Population
  - Total: 5,628 (SAL 2021)
- Postcode: 2615
Suburbs around Holt
Macnamara; Belconnen (district)	Macgregor	Latham
Strathnairn	Holt	Higgins
Strathnairn	Belconnen (district)	Belconnen (district)

Holt (/ˈhɒlt/) (postcode: 2615) is a suburb in the Belconnen district of Canberra, located within the Australian Capital Territory, Australia. It was gazetted on 2 July 1970 and was named after Harold Holt, Prime Minister of Australia 1966–67. Streets are named after sportsmen and sportswomen.

Holt is bounded by Southern Cross Drive, Starke Street, MacNaughton Street, Drake Brockman Drive and the edge of the Belconnen Magpies golf course. It also borders on open farm and bushland, and is a short distance away from the Molongolo river. Ginninderra Falls Tourist Park and Parkwood, a very small light industrial area, are also nearby. It adjoins the suburbs of Higgins, Latham, Macgregor and Strathnairn. The suburb contains Kippax Centre, a group centre serving the surrounding area, including the Kippax Fair shopping centre.

== Facilities ==
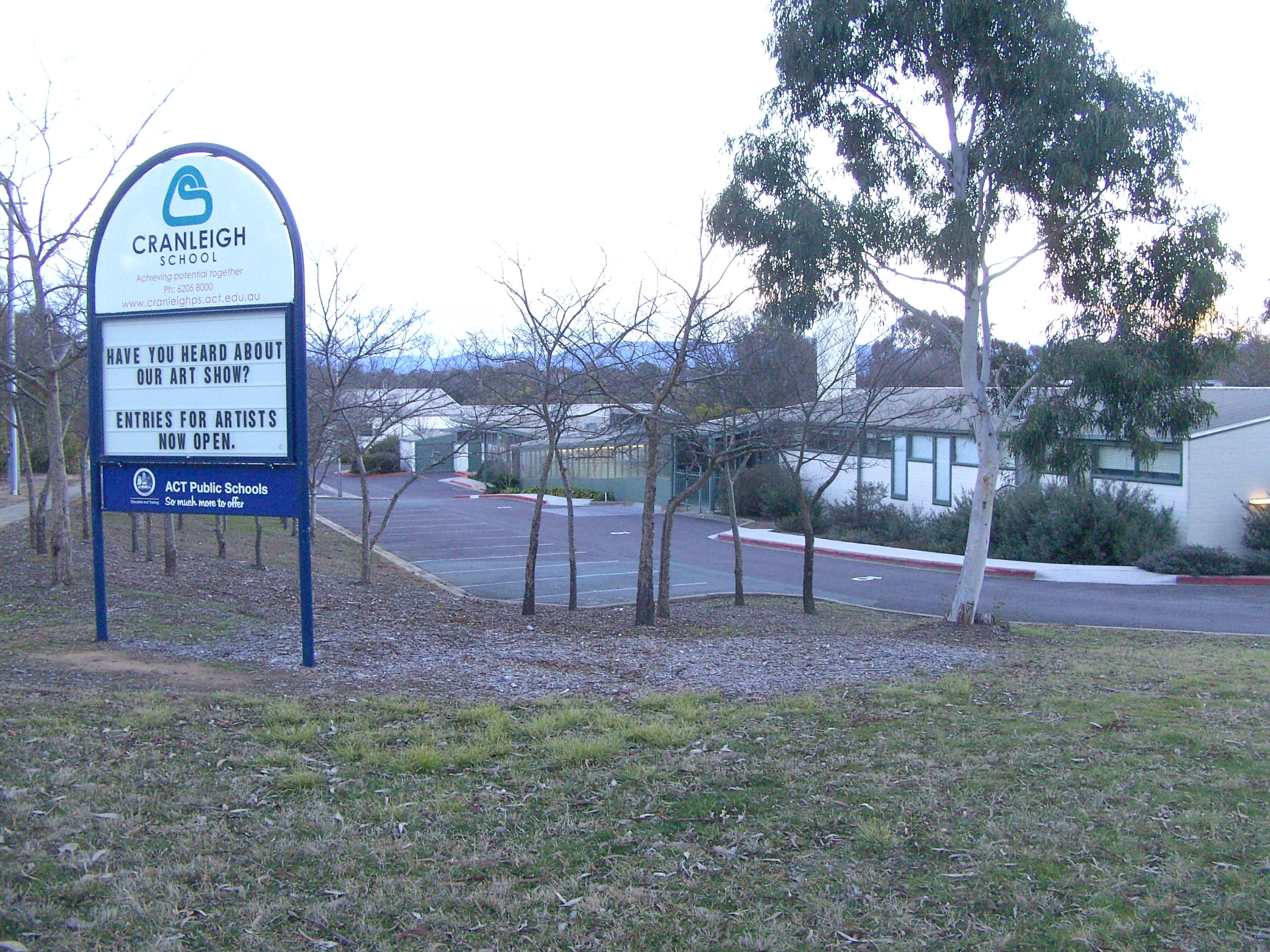
Cranleigh School

Holt has multiple local shops, a neighbourhood oval, sporting fields, and Kingsford Smith School on the site of the former Ginninderra High School. This school was built to accommodate over 1000 students from preschool to year ten following the closure of the former Holt primary school (now housing community organisations) and the nearby Higgins primary school. Kingsford Smith School opened in 2009 for students from preschool to year 7, with the first year 10 group graduating in 2012.

Also within Holt is the Cranleigh school, which caters for preschool and primary children with special needs. It commemorates the Cranleigh Farm of Lieutenant General James Gordon Legge that occupied the nearby area from the mid-1920s to late 1940s with the main house at the corner of Southern Cross Drive and Kingsford Smith Drive.

== Governance ==
For the purposes of Australian federal elections for the House of Representatives, Holt is in the Division of Fenner.

For the purposes of Australian Capital Territory elections for the ACT Legislative Assembly, Holt is in the Ginninderra electorate.

== Churches ==
There are four churches located in Holt. St. John the Apostle Catholic Church is on Blackham Street. St. James' Anglican Church is on Beaurepaire Street. Kippax Uniting Church is on Hardwick Crescent and Luke Street. St. Therese of the Child Jesus Local Society of Saint Pius X Mission is located in Beaurepaire Crescent.

== Geology ==
Silurian age Deakin Volcanics are in the north east with the following kinds of rock:

- Purple pink rhyolite is found in the north east.
- In the east is purple and green tuff.
- Purple rhyodacite is in the north
- Silurian Walker Volcanics purple and grey-green rhyodacite is in the west and south of Holt.

Under the Belconnen golf course is green and cream rhyolite of the Walker Volcanics. West of the golf course is a large sedimentary exposure of limestone and shale. A coarse green grey porphyry intrusive can be found 3 kilometres (1.9 mi) to the west of Holt.
