= Run (cricket) =

Unit of scoring in cricket

How runs are scored and teams win a match

In cricket, a run is the unit of scoring. The team with the most runs wins in many versions of the game, and always draws at worst (see result), except for some results decided by the DLS method, which is used in rain-shortened limited-overs games when the two teams have had a different number of opportunities to score runs.

One run (known as a "single") is scored when the two batters (the striker and the non-striker) start off positioned at opposite ends of the pitch (which has a length of 22 yards) and then they each arrive safely at the other end of the pitch (i.e. they cross each other without being run out).

There is no limit on the number of runs that may be scored off a single delivery, and depending on how long it takes the fielding team to recover the ball, the batters may run more than once. Each completed run, if it occurs after the striker hits the ball with the bat (or a gloved hand holding the bat), increments the scores of both the team and the striker.

A batter may also score 4 or 6 runs (without having to run) by striking the ball to the boundary.

- If the ball hits the ground before hitting or passing the boundary, then four runs are scored.
- If the ball passes or hits the boundary without first bouncing, then six runs are scored.

The team's total score in the innings is the aggregate of all its batters' individual scores plus any extras (runs scored regardless of whether the bat or glove hit the ball). One extra is scored each time the bowler bowls an illegal delivery to the batter, and four extras are scored if the ball reaches the boundary without having been struck by the batter.

To complete a run, both batters must make their ground, with some part of their person or bat touching the ground behind the popping crease at the other end of the pitch. Attempting a run carries a risk factor because either batter can be run out, (one method of dismissal), with the run then not being scored, if the fielding side can break one of the wickets (at either end of the pitch) with the ball before the batter near that wicket has completed the run.

== Method ==
Scoring runs is the subject of Law 18 in the Laws of Cricket. Boundaries are covered in Law 19. How the Batsman makes his ground is Law 30.

=== Runs scored by running ===
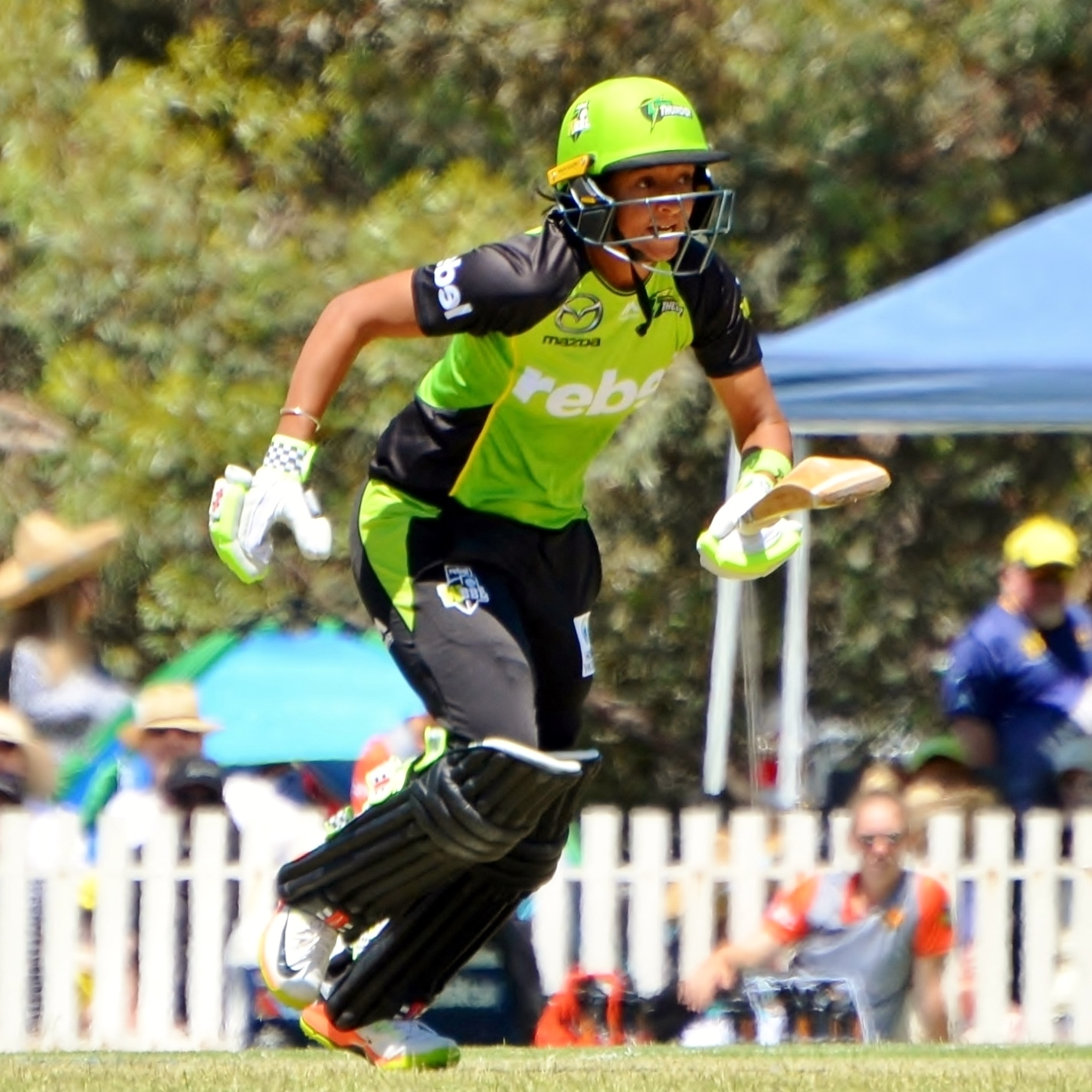
Harmanpreet Kaur taking a run while batting for Sydney Thunder, 2018.

Batsmen frequently run singles and also "twos" and "threes". If the batsmen run a single or a three, they have "changed ends", so the striking batsman becomes the non-striker for the next delivery, and vice versa. If the single or three is scored off the last delivery of the over, the striker, having changed ends, retains the strike for the first delivery of the next over. There are rare instances of "fours" being all run when the ball does not reach the boundary. A "five" is possible, but usually arises from a mistake by the fielders, such as an overthrow. The batsman is never compelled to run and can deliberately play without attempting to score.

This is known as running between the wickets. During each run, each batter starts off behind one of the popping creases and then must go beyond the other popping crease, running a minimum distance of 58 feet (17.7 m).

The striking batsman may begin his or her run from the moment the ball hits the bat; the non-striker may begin his or her run before the ball is struck, but runs the risk of being run out if they move out of their crease before the bowler delivers the ball. Leaving the crease early, to gain an advantage in running between the wickets, is known as backing up.

The batsmen stop running when they judge that the ball is sufficiently controlled by the fielding team to prevent another run, for example when it is returned to the bowler or the wicketkeeper.

If, when turning for an additional run, one of the batsmen fails to ground some part of their body or bat behind the popping crease, the umpire declares a "short run" and the run does not count but, even if the bat is dropped, runs do count as long as each batsman makes his ground with his bat or person somehow.

=== Boundaries ===
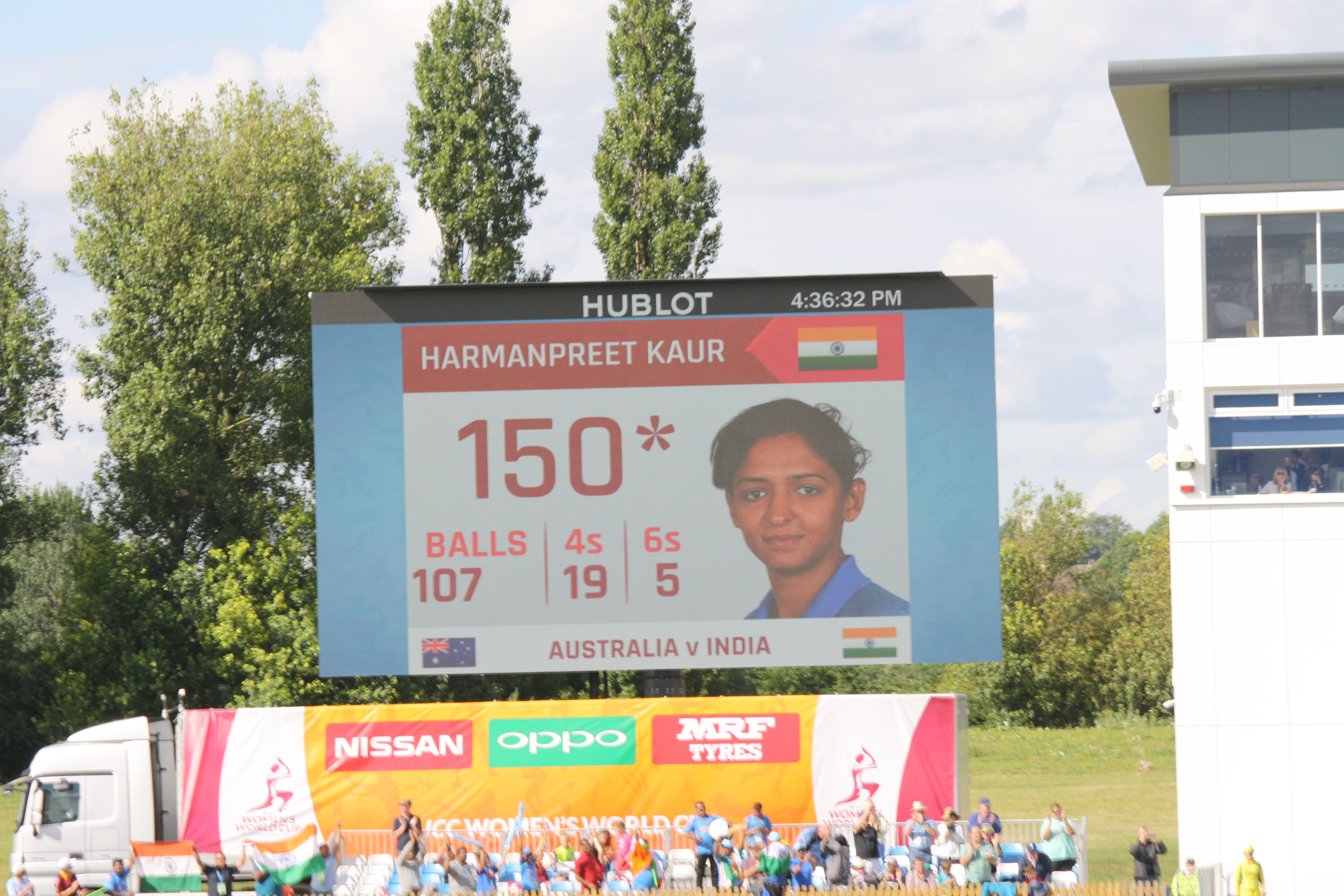
Scoreboard showing number of runs scored by batter Harmanpreet Kaur (150), including how many boundaries she has scored (19 fours and 5 sixes).

The act of running is unnecessary if the batsman hits the ball to the marked boundary of the field. If the ball reaches the boundary having made contact with the ground, four runs are added to the scores of both the batsman (if he had struck the ball) and the team. If the batsman succeeds in hitting the ball onto or over the boundary on the full (i.e. the ball does not contact the ground until it has hit or is beyond the boundary), six runs are added. If the batsmen are running when the ball reaches the boundary, they can stop, and their team will be awarded either the number of runs for the boundary (4 or 6), or runs the batsmen completed together (including a run in progress if they already crossed when the boundary is scored), whichever is greater.

It is also possible for a fielder to stop the ball from reaching the boundary, but for the ball to subsequently reach the boundary due to an overthrow by the fielder. In this case, four runs are scored (which are credited to the striker) in addition to any runs the batters had scored by running on that delivery.

=== Extras ===
In addition to runs scored by the batsmen, the team total is incremented by extras (also known as "sundries" in Australia; they are not added to a batsman's individual score), which arise because:

- The bowler has delivered a wide or no-ball
- The fielders have caused a no-ball (each of which incurs a one-run penalty)
- The fielders have failed to control a ball that did not make contact with the bat (byes and leg byes), thus allowing the batsmen to run.
- Byes, leg-byes, and wides that elude the fielders and cross the boundary score four (never six) in addition to the one-run penalty scored for a no-ball or wide if applicable.
- Five penalty runs are awarded by the umpires, either to the batting team or to the fielding team as applicable, for infringement of some of the Laws, usually relating to unfair play or player conduct.
  - For example five runs are awarded to the batting team if the ball hits a helmet on the ground belonging to the fielding team, as per Law 28.3.2. Five runs are awarded to the fielding team if the batting team causes avoidable damage to the pitch after due warning by the umpire, in accordance with Law 41.14.3. If the umpire considers a short run to have been a deliberate act, as per Law 18.5.2, they will disallow all runs to the batting side and award 5 Penalty runs to the fielding side. Law 41.3 states it is an offence for any player to take any action which changes the condition of the ball; wilful damage outside the scope of allowable actions shall result in replacement of the ball and a five-run penalty being incurred in favour of the non offending side.

== History ==
In the written records of cricket, "run" is as old as "cricket" itself. In the earliest known reference to the sport, dated Monday, 17 January 1597 (Julian date), Surrey coroner John Derrick made a legal deposition concerning a plot of land in Guildford that when (c. 1550):

"a scholler of the Ffree Schoole of Guildeford, hee and diverse of his fellowes did runne and play there at creckett and other plaies".

It may well be that, in this context, "runne" meant running in general. For a long time, until well into the 18th century, the scorers sat on the field and increments to the score were known as "notches" because they would notch the scores on a stick, with a deeper nick at 20. The same method was used by shepherds when counting sheep. In the earliest known laws of cricket, dated 1744, one of the rules states:

"If in running a Notch, the Wicket is struck down by a Throw, before his Foot, Hand, or Bat is over the Popping-Crease, or a Stump hit by the Ball, though the Bail was down, it's out".

In the 1774 version, the equivalent rule states:

"Or if in running a notch, the wicket is struck down by a throw, or with the ball in hand, before his foot, hand, or bat is grounded over the popping-crease; but if the bail is off, a stump must be struck out of the ground by the ball".

These are the earliest known references to running as the means of scoring. The change of terminology from "notch" to "run" was gradual, and both terms were in use in 1800. The result of a match played in Sussex on 3 August 1800 was a win "by 25 notches" while another match in Sussex on 9 August 1800 was won "by an innings and 38 runs".

== Records ==
For team and individual run-scoring records, see List of Test cricket records, List of One Day International cricket records, List of Twenty20 International records, and List of first-class cricket records.

== Bibliography ==
- Ashley-Cooper, F. S. (1900). At the Sign of the Wicket: Cricket 1742–1751. Cricket magazine.
- Haygarth, Arthur (1862). Scores & Biographies, Volume 1 (1744–1826). Lillywhite. ISBN 1-900592-23-1.
- McCann, Tim (2004). Sussex Cricket in the Eighteenth Century. Sussex Record Society.
- Underdown, David (2000). Start of Play. Allen Lane.
