= Waheed Mirza =

Pakistani cricketer (born 1955)

Personal information
- Born: 4 May 1955 (age 71); Karachi, Sindh, Pakistan
- Batting: Right-handed
- Bowling: Right arm fast-medium
- Role: All-rounder, occasional wicket-keeper

Domestic team information
- Years: Team
- 1975/76: Karachi Blues
- 1975/76–1976/77: Karachi Whites
- 1976/77–1977/78: Sindh
- 1977/78: Habib Bank Limited
- 1978/79–1987/88: United Bank Limited
- 1983/84: Karachi Whites
- First-class debut: 29 August 1975 Karachi Blues v Pakistan International Airlines
- Last First-class: 19 February 1987 United Bank Limited v Pakistan Automobiles Corporation
- List A debut: 4 February 1976 Sind v National Bank of Pakistan
- Last List A: 8 September 1987 United Bank Limited v House Building Finance Corporation

Career statistics
Competition	First-class	List A
Matches	60	17
Runs scored	2371	143
Batting average	25.77	11.00
100s/50s	2/9	0/0
Top score	324	25
Balls bowled	3030	514
Wickets	53	11
Bowling average	28.05	25.54
5 wickets in innings	1	0
10 wickets in match	0	n/a
Best bowling	5/36	3/28
Catches/stumpings	56/1	5/–
- Source: CricketArchive, 25 September 2008

Waheed Mirza (born 4 May 1955) is a former Pakistani first-class cricketer. A right-handed batsman, he is notable for having partnered Mansoor Akhtar in a world record opening stand of 561 in 1977. It occurred on 7 and 8 February, while playing for Karachi Whites against Quetta at the National Stadium in Karachi. Mirza scored 324 as part of that opening stand; he had not previously scored a first class hundred. Unusually, Akhtar and Mirza not only opened the batting, but also opened the bowling in both innings. The partnership remains the highest for the 1st wicket in first-class cricket.

Despite scoring this triple century, Mirza scored only one other first class century in his 60 matches, and averaged only just over 25.

He is a maternal uncle of the Pakistani Test cricketer Fawad Alam.
