= 2007 WNBL Finals =

Team	Coach	Wins
Canberra Capitals	Carrie Graf	1
Sydney Uni Flames	Karen Dalton	0
- Dates: 2 – 17 February 2007
- MVP: Tracey Beatty (Canberra)
- Preliminary final: Canberra def. Adelaide, 82–74

The 2007 WNBL Finals was the postseason tournament of the WNBL's 2006–07 season. The Canberra Capitals were the defending champions and they successfully defended their title, defeating the Sydney Uni Flames 73–59. The 2007 Championship would be Canberra's fifth overall title.

== Standings ==
#	WNBL Championship Ladder				
#	Team	W	L	PCT	GP
1	Sydney Uni Flames	16	5	76.2	21
2	Canberra Capitals	15	6	71.4	21
3	Adelaide Lightning	15	6	71.4	21
4	Dandenong Rangers	12	9	57.1	21
5	Bulleen Boomers	12	9	57.1	21
6	Townsville Fire	10	11	47.6	21
7	Perth Lynx	3	18	14.3	21
8	AIS	1	20	4.8	21

== Bracket ==
Semifinals
Sydney Uni Flames	74
Canberra Capitals	65
Adelaide Lightning	66
Dandenong Rangers	61

Preliminary final
Canberra Capitals	82
Adelaide Lightning	74

Grand final
Sydney Uni Flames	59
Canberra Capitals	73

== Semi-finals ==
=== (1) Sydney Uni Flames vs. (2) Canberra Capitals ===
2 February 2007

Report

Sydney Uni Flames	74–65	Canberra Capitals
Pts: Porter 19; Rebs: Fallon, Porter 8 Asts: Three tied 3		Pts: Beatty 14; Rebs: Loffhagen 12; Asts: Abrams 7

Sydney Uni Sports & Aquatic Centre, Sydney, New South Wales

=== (3) Adelaide Lightning vs. (4) Dandenong Rangers ===
2 February 2007

Report

Adelaide Lightning	66–61	Dandenong Rangers
Pts: Foley 21; Rebs: Rasmussen 14; Asts: Rasmussen 6		Pts: O'Hea 28; Rebs: O'Hea 6 Asts: MacLeod 4

Distinctive Homes Dome, Adelaide, South Australia

== Preliminary final ==
=== (2) Canberra Capitals vs. (3) Adelaide Lightning ===
10 February 2007

Report

Canberra Capitals	82–74	Adelaide Lightning
Pts: Bibby 23; Rebs: Abrams, Bishop 6 Asts: Bevilaqua 4		Pts: Gahan 20; Rebs: Gahan 10; Asts: King 3

AIS Arena, Canberra, Australian Capital Territory

== Grand Final ==
=== (1) Sydney Uni Flames vs. (2) Canberra Capitals ===
17 February 2007

Report

Sydney Uni Flames	59–73	Canberra Capitals
Pts: Porter 15; Rebs: Musselwhite 7 Asts: Poto 3		Pts: Hurst 15; Rebs: Beatty 12; Asts: Bevilaqua 4

Penrith Sports Stadium, Penrith, New South Wales

=== Rosters ===
2006–07 Sydney Uni Flames roster
Players
Coaches

Pos.	No.	Nat.	Name	Ht.
G	6	(Australia)	Poto, Alicia	1.66 m (5 ft 5 in)
G	8	(Australia)	Afeaki, Eva	1.84 m (6 ft 0 in)
F	9	(Australia)	Fallon, Trisha	1.90 m (6 ft 3 in)
G	11	(Australia)	Dombkins, Mikaela	1.81 m (5 ft 11 in)
F	12	(Australia)	Smith, Melissa	1.87 m (6 ft 2 in)
C	13	(Australia)	Herrick, Rachel	1.92 m (6 ft 4 in)
F	14	(Australia)	Porter, Natalie (C)	1.85 m (6 ft 1 in)
G/F	15	(Australia)	Musselwhite, Michelle	1.76 m (5 ft 9 in)
F	22	(Australia)	Woodyard, Georgia	1.87 m (6 ft 2 in)
G	32	(Australia)	Veal, Kristen	1.76 m (5 ft 9 in)

Head coach

- (Australia) Karen Dalton

Assistant coach(es)

- (Australia) Vlad Alava
- (Australia) Darren Allie
- (Australia) Michael Haynes

Legend

- (C) Team captain
- (DP) Development player
- (I) Import player
- Injured

2006–07 Canberra Capitals roster
Players
Coaches

Pos.	No.	Nat.	Name	Ht.
G	7	(Australia)	Hurst, Natalie	1.63 m (5 ft 4 in)
F	9	(Australia)	Sinclair, Peta	1.87 m (6 ft 2 in)
F/C	10	(Australia)	Bishop, Abby	1.90 m (6 ft 3 in)
G	12	(Australia)	Dalgleish, Michaela	1.79 m (5 ft 10 in)
G	13	(Australia)	Abrams, Kellie (C)	1.75 m (5 ft 9 in)
G	11	(Australia)	Bibby, Jessica	1.69 m (5 ft 7 in)
F	22	(New Zealand)	Loffhagen, Donna	1.85 m (6 ft 1 in)
C	25	(Australia)	Beatty, Tracey	2.02 m (6 ft 8 in)
F	32	(Australia)	Gwyther, Kylie	1.78 m (5 ft 10 in)
G	44	(Australia)	Bevilaqua, Tully	1.64 m (5 ft 5 in)

Head coach

- (Australia) Carrie Graf

Assistant coach(es)

- (Australia) Sandy Tomley

Legend

- (C) Team captain
- (DP) Development player
- (I) Import player
- Injured
