= 2009 WNBL Finals =

Team	Coach	Wins
Canberra Capitals	Carrie Graf	1
Bulleen Boomers	Cheryl Chambers	0
- Dates: 25 February – 13 March 2009
- MVP: Natalie Hurst (Canberra)
- Preliminary final: Bulleen def. Townsville, 79–68

The 2009 WNBL Finals was the postseason tournament of the WNBL's 2008–09 season. The Adelaide Lightning were the defending champions but were defeated by Townsville in the Semi-finals. The Canberra Capitals won their sixth WNBL championship with a 61–58 win over the Bulleen Boomers.

== Standings ==
#	WNBL Championship Ladder				
#	Team	W	L	PCT	GP
1	Canberra Capitals	19	3	86.36	22
2	Bulleen Boomers	17	5	77.27	22
3	Townsville Fire	16	6	72.73	22
4	Adelaide Lightning	15	7	68.18	22
5	Bendigo Spirit	14	8	63.64	22
6	Sydney Uni Flames	9	13	40.91	22
7	Dandenong Rangers	7	15	31.82	22
8	Logan Thunder	7	15	31.82	22
9	Perth Lynx	4	18	18.18	22
10	Australian Institute of Sport	2	20	9.09	22

== Bracket ==
Elimination final
4	Adelaide Lightning	81
5	Bendigo Spirit	73

Semifinals
1	Canberra Capitals	60
2	Bulleen Boomers	52
3	Townsville Fire	91
4	Adelaide Lightning	78

Preliminary final
Bulleen Boomers	79
Townsville Fire	68

Grand final
Canberra Capitals	61
Bulleen Boomers	58

== Elimination final ==
=== (4) Adelaide Lightning vs. (5) Bendigo Spirit ===
25 February 2009

Report

Adelaide Lightning	81–73	Bendigo Spirit
Scoring by quarter: 20–18, 20–23, 22–11, 19–21
Pts: Duke 19; Rebs: Francis, Gahan 9 Asts: Francis, Gahan 4		Pts: Harrower 22; Rebs: King 8 Asts: Harrower 7

Distinctive Homes Dome, Adelaide, South Australia

== Semi-finals ==
=== (1) Canberra Capitals vs. (2) Bulleen Boomers ===
27 February 2009

Report

Canberra Capitals	60–52	Bulleen Boomers
Pts: Bishop, Tolo 14; Rebs: Bishop, Hurst 11; Asts: Abrams 7		Pts: Carr 10; Rebs: Hibbert, Milner 6 Asts: Hibbert 4

AIS Arena, Canberra, Australian Capital Territory
Attendance: 2,250

=== (3) Townsville Fire vs. (4) Adelaide Lightning ===
28 February 2009

Report

Townsville Fire	91–78	Adelaide Lightning
Scoring by quarter: 29–13, 18–14, 21–26, 23–25
Pts: Cox 24; Rebs: Cox 9 Asts: Flanagan 4		Pts: Foley 24; Rebs: Foley, Gahan 5 Asts: Duke, Gahan 4

Sea FM Stadium, Townsville, Queensland

== Preliminary final ==
=== (2) Bulleen Boomers vs. (3) Townsville Fire ===
6 March 2009

Report

Bulleen Boomers	79–68	Townsville Fire
Scoring by quarter: 16–18, 24–14, 19–18, 20–18
Pts: Glaubitz 31; Rebs: Carr, Hibbert 9 Asts: Milner 5		Pts: Cox 17; Rebs: Crouse 11; Asts: Lewis 3

The Veneto Club, Melbourne, Victoria

== Grand Final ==
=== (1) Canberra Capitals vs. (2) Bulleen Boomers ===
13 March 2009
5:30 PM (AEDT)

Report

Canberra Capitals	61–58	Bulleen Boomers
Scoring by quarter: 13–15, 19–17, 16–10, 13–16
Pts: Cosier 13; Rebs: Bishop 14; Asts: Abrams 4		Pts: Hibbert, Penaluna 14; Rebs: Hibbert 8 Asts: Milner 7

AIS Arena, Canberra, Australian Capital Territory
Attendance: 5,000

=== Rosters ===
2008–09 Canberra Capitals roster
Players
Coaches

Pos.	No.	Nat.	Name	Ht.
G	4	(Australia)	Jansen, Lauren	1.78 m (5 ft 10 in)
G	5	(Australia)	Perera, Chantella	1.74 m (5 ft 9 in)
G	7	(Australia)	Hurst, Natalie	1.63 m (5 ft 4 in)
G	9	(Australia)	Dalgleish, Michaela	1.79 m (5 ft 10 in)
F	10	(Australia)	Bishop, Abby	1.90 m (6 ft 3 in)
G	11	(Australia)	Bibby, Jessica	1.69 m (5 ft 7 in)
F/C	12	(Australia)	Tolo, Marianna	1.96 m (6 ft 5 in)
G	13	(Australia)	Abrams, Kellie (C)	1.75 m (5 ft 9 in)
F	14	(Australia)	Sinclair, Peta	1.87 m (6 ft 2 in)
F	21	(Australia)	Bowley, Hannah	1.85 m (6 ft 1 in)
C	25	(Australia)	Beatty, Tracey	2.02 m (6 ft 8 in)
C	30	(Australia)	Cosier, Michelle	2.02 m (6 ft 8 in)

Head coach

- (Australia) Carrie Graf

Legend

- (C) Team captain
- (DP) Development player
- (I) Import player
- Injured

2008–09 Bulleen Boomers roster
Players
Coaches

Pos.	No.	Nat.	Name	Ht.
G	4	(Australia)	Milner, Sharin	1.87 m (6 ft 2 in)
G	6	(Australia)	Glaubitz, Desiree (C)	1.77 m (5 ft 10 in)
G	9	(Australia)	Reid, Kylie	1.73 m (5 ft 8 in)
F	11	(Australia)	Carr, Zoe	1.84 m (6 ft 0 in)
F	14	(Australia)	Dawson, Lucy	1.81 m (5 ft 11 in)
G	15	(Australia)	Cann, Tenille	1.66 m (5 ft 5 in)
C	21	(Australia)	Penaluna, Elyse	1.93 m (6 ft 4 in)
G	22	(New Zealand)	Pardon, Lisa	1.73 m (5 ft 8 in)
G	40	(Australia)	Hibbert, Katrina	1.73 m (5 ft 8 in)
F	41	(Australia)	Crosswhite, Anna	1.86 m (6 ft 1 in)

Head coach

- (Australia) Cheryl Chambers

Legend

- (C) Team captain
- (DP) Development player
- (I) Import player
- Injured

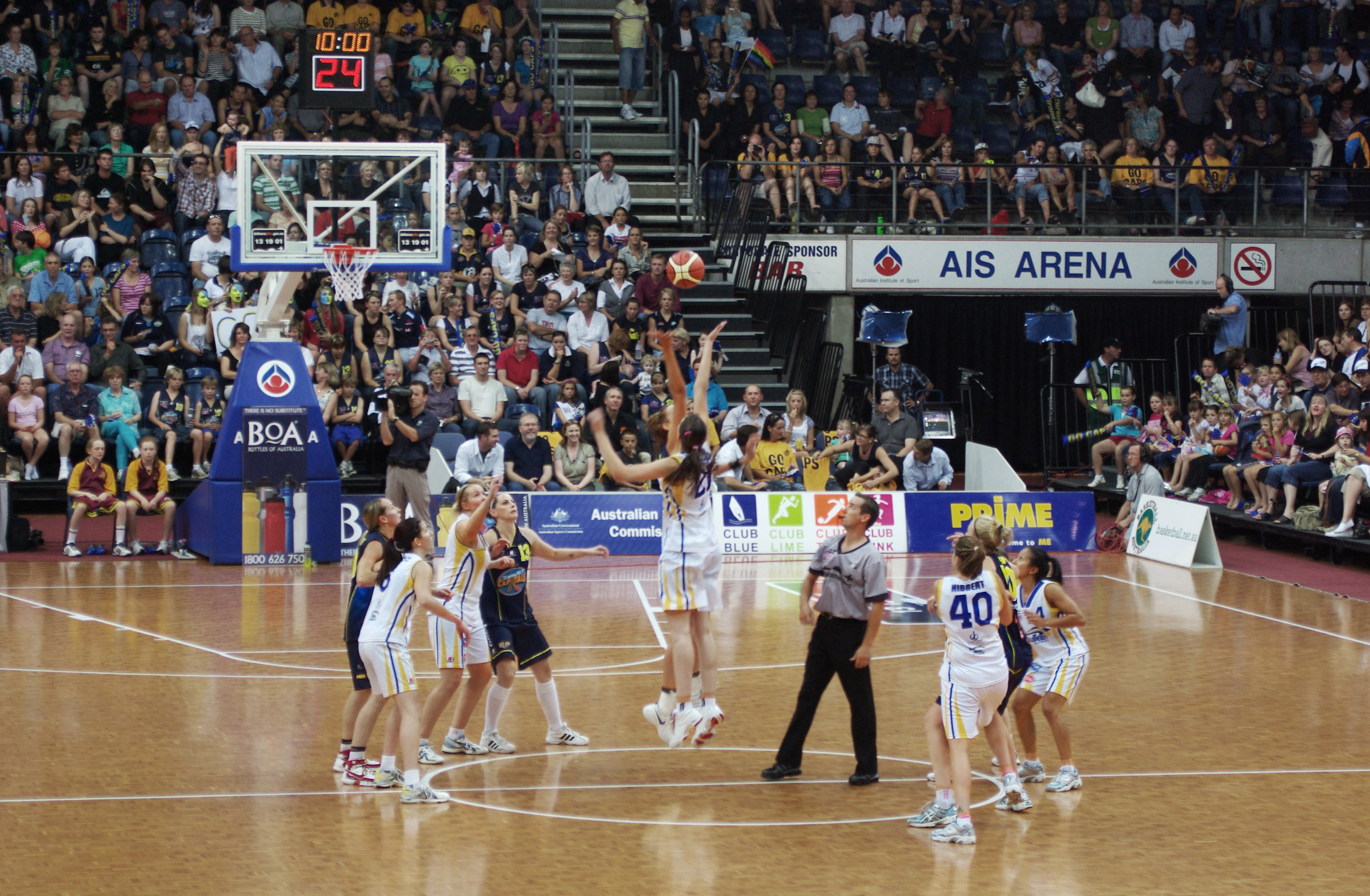
2009 WNBL Grand Final Tip-off at AIS Arena
