= 2010 WNBL Finals =

| Team | Coach | Wins |
|---|---|---|
| Canberra Capitals | Carrie Graf | 1 |
| Bulleen Boomers | Tom Maher | 0 |
- Dates: 17 February – 6 March 2010
- MVP: Lauren Jackson (Canberra)
- Preliminary final: Canberra def. Sydney, 61–56

The 2010 WNBL Finals was the postseason tournament of the WNBL's 2009–10 season. The Canberra Capitals were the defending champions and they successfully defended their title with a 75–70 win over the Bulleen Boomers in the Grand Final.

== Standings ==
| # | WNBL Championship Ladder | | | | |
| # | Team | W | L | PCT | GP |
|---|---|---|---|---|---|
| 1 | Bulleen Boomers | 21 | 1 | 95.5 | 22 |
| 2 | Sydney Uni Flames | 17 | 5 | 77.3 | 22 |
| 3 | Canberra Capitals | 16 | 6 | 72.7 | 22 |
| 4 | Townsville Fire | 14 | 8 | 63.6 | 22 |
| 5 | Bendigo Spirit | 13 | 9 | 59.1 | 22 |
| 6 | Adelaide Lightning | 13 | 9 | 59.1 | 22 |
| 7 | Dandenong Rangers | 7 | 15 | 31.8 | 22 |
| 8 | Logan Thunder | 6 | 16 | 27.3 | 22 |
| 9 | Perth Lynx | 2 | 20 | 9.1 | 22 |
| 10 | Australian Institute of Sport | 1 | 21 | 4.5 | 22 |

== Bracket ==
Elimination final
4 | Townsville Fire | 84
5 | Bendigo Spirit | 73

Semifinals
1 | Bulleen Boomers | 72
Sydney Uni Flames | 55
Canberra Capitals | 70
Townsville Fire | 39

Preliminary final
Sydney Uni Flames | 56
Canberra Capitals | 61

Grand final
Bulleen Boomers | 70
Canberra Capitals | 75

== Elimination final ==
=== (4) Townsville Fire vs. (5) Bendigo Spirit ===
17 February 2010

Boxscore

| Townsville Fire | 84–73 | Bendigo Spirit |
| Pts: Flanagan 21; Rebs: Smith 16; Asts: Cox 4 | | Pts: Harrower 23; Rebs: Finnigan 6 Asts: Harrower 5 |

NPA Stadium, Townsville, Queensland

== Semi-finals ==
=== (1) Bulleen Boomers vs. (2) Sydney Uni Flames ===
20 February 2010

Boxscore

| Bulleen Boomers | 72–55 | Sydney Uni Flames |
| Pts: O'Hea 20; Rebs: Cambage 12; Asts: Milner 5 | | Pts: Porter 22; Rebs: Porter 10; Asts: Afeaki 5 |

Knox Stadium, Melbourne, Victoria

=== (3) Canberra Capitals vs. (4) Townsville Fire ===
21 February 2010

Boxscore

| Canberra Capitals | 70–39 | Townsville Fire |
| Pts: Bishop 20; Rebs: Bishop 16; Asts: Wilson 6 | | Pts: Flanagan 9 Rebs: Smith 5 Asts: Cox 2 |

AIS Arena, Canberra, Australian Capital Territory

== Preliminary final ==
=== (2) Sydney Uni Flames vs. (3) Canberra Capitals ===
27 February 2010

Boxscore

| Sydney Uni Flames | 56–61 | Canberra Capitals |
| Pts: Smith 20; Rebs: Dombkins 10; Asts: Afeaki 3 | | Pts: Hurst 18; Rebs: Jackson 18; Asts: Abrams 6 |

State Sports Centre, Sydney, New South Wales

== Grand Final ==
=== (1) Bulleen Boomers vs. (3) Canberra Capitals ===
6 March 2010

Boxscore

| Bulleen Boomers | 70–75 | Canberra Capitals |
| Pts: O'Hea 26; Rebs: Cambage 11; Asts: O'Hea 5 | | Pts: Hurst 21; Rebs: Jackson 13; Asts: Hurst 3 |

State Netball and Hockey Centre, Melbourne, Victoria

=== Rosters ===
2009–10 Bulleen Boomers roster
Players
Coaches

| Pos. | No. | Nat. | Name | Ht. |
|---|---|---|---|---|
| G | 4 | (Australia) | Milner, Sharin (C) | 1.87 m (6 ft 2 in) |
| G | 6 | (Australia) | Glaubitz, Desiree (C) | 1.77 m (5 ft 10 in) |
| C | 8 | (Australia) | Cambage, Liz | 2.03 m (6 ft 8 in) |
| G | 9 | (Australia) | Reid, Kylie | 1.73 m (5 ft 8 in) |
| G | 10 | (Australia) | Jeffers, Lauren | 1.70 m (5 ft 7 in) |
| G/F | 11 | (Australia) | O'Hea, Jenna | 1.87 m (6 ft 2 in) |
| F | 12 | (Australia) | Jarry, Rachel | 1.85 m (6 ft 1 in) |
| F | 15 | (Australia) | Pearce, Lauren | 1.81 m (5 ft 11 in) |
| C | 21 | (Australia) | Penaluna, Elyse | 1.93 m (6 ft 4 in) |
| G | 22 | (New Zealand) | Pardon, Lisa | 1.73 m (5 ft 8 in) |
| G/F | 33 | (Australia) | Zavecz, Hanna | 1.81 m (5 ft 11 in) |
| F | 41 | (Australia) | Crosswhite, Anna | 1.86 m (6 ft 1 in) |

Head coach

- (Australia) Tom Maher

Assistant coach(es)

- (Australia) Michele Timms
- (Australia) Gary Fox

Legend

- (C) Team captain
- (DP) Development player
- (I) Import player
- Injured

2009–10 Canberra Capitals roster
Players
Coaches

| Pos. | No. | Nat. | Name | Ht. |
|---|---|---|---|---|
| G | 5 | (Australia) | Perera, Chantella | 1.74 m (5 ft 9 in) |
| G | 7 | (Australia) | Hurst, Natalie | 1.63 m (5 ft 4 in) |
| G | 8 | (Australia) | Wilson, Carly | 1.89 m (6 ft 2 in) |
| G | 9 | (Australia) | Romeo, Nicole | 1.66 m (5 ft 5 in) |
| F | 10 | (Australia) | Bishop, Abby | 1.90 m (6 ft 3 in) |
| G | 11 | (Australia) | Bibby, Jessica | 1.69 m (5 ft 7 in) |
| F/C | 12 | (Australia) | Tolo, Marianna | 1.96 m (6 ft 5 in) |
| G | 13 | (Australia) | Abrams, Kellie (C) | 1.75 m (5 ft 9 in) |
| F | 14 | (Australia) | Rose, Katie | 1.80 m (5 ft 11 in) |
| F/C | 15 | (Australia) | Jackson, Lauren | 1.96 m (6 ft 5 in) |
| F | 21 | (Australia) | Bowley, Hannah | 1.85 m (6 ft 1 in) |
| C | 25 | (Australia) | Beatty, Tracey | 2.02 m (6 ft 8 in) |

Head coach

- (Australia) Carrie Graf

Assistant coach(es)

- (Australia) Chris Lucas
- (Australia) Sandy Tomley

Legend

- (C) Team captain
- (DP) Development player
- (I) Import player
- Injured
