= List of 2020 WNBL season transactions =

This is a list of transactions that have taken place during the off-season and the 2020 WNBL season.

== Front office movements ==
=== Head coach changes ===
Off-season

Departure date	Team	Outgoing head coach	Reason for departure	Hire date	Incoming head coach	Last coaching position	Ref.
March 12	Perth Lynx	(Australia) Andy Stewart	Did not seek contract renewal	June 5	(Australia) Ryan Petrik	Perth Lynx assistant coach (2015–2020)	

== Player movement ==
=== Free agency ===
Player	Date signed	New team	Former team	Ref
(Australia) Demi Skinner	March 11	Bendigo Spirit		
(Australia) Stephanie Talbot	April 16	Adelaide Lightning		
(Australia) Chelsea Brook	April 25	Adelaide Lightning		
(Australia) Marianna Tolo	June 2	Canberra Capitals		
(Australia) Kelsey Griffin	June 3	Canberra Capitals		
(Australia) Keely Froling	June 4	Canberra Capitals		
(Australia) Maddison Rocci	June 4	Canberra Capitals		
(Australia) Abby Cubillo	June 4	Canberra Capitals		
(Australia) Alex Delaney	June 4	Canberra Capitals		
(Australia) Jenna O'Hea	June 4	Southside Flyers		
(Australia) Mia Murray	June 6	Townsville Fire		
(Australia) Shyla Heal	June 9	Townsville Fire	Bendigo Spirit	
(Australia) Alanna Smith	June 10	Adelaide Lightning	Incheon S-Birds (KOR)	
(Australia) Tessa Lavey	June 10	Bendigo Spirit		
(Australia) Cassidy McLean	June 11	Bendigo Spirit		
(Australia) Tahlia Tupaea	June 11	Canberra Capitals	Sydney Uni Flames	
(Australia) Madeleine Garrick	June 11	Melbourne Boomers		
(Australia) Tess Madgen	June 15	Melbourne Boomers	Townsville Fire	
(Australia) Sami Whitcomb	June 17	Perth Lynx	Basket Lattes (FRA)	
(Australia) Lauren Nicholson	June 17	Townsville Fire	Adelaide Lightning	
(United States) Brittany Smart	June 18	Canberra Capitals	Sydney Uni Flames	
(Australia) Cayla George	June 18	Melbourne Boomers		
(Australia) Katie Ebzery	June 19	Perth Lynx		
(Australia) Nadeen Payne	June 19	Townsville Fire	Perth Lynx	
(Australia) Darcee Garbin	June 20	Perth Lynx	Townsville Fire	
(Australia) Paige Price	June 24	Bendigo Spirit	Melbourne Boomers	
(Australia) Ezi Magbegor	June 24	Melbourne Boomers		
(Australia) Anneli Maley	June 24	Sydney Uni Flames	Southside Flyers	
(Australia) Lauren Mansfield	June 24	Sydney Uni Flames	Perth Lynx	
(Australia) Megan McKay	June 25	Townsville Fire	TSV 1880 Wasserburg (GER)	
(Australia) Alex Ciabattoni	June 26	Perth Lynx	Battipaglia (ITA)	
(Australia) Jasmin Fejo	June 29	Adelaide Lightning		
(Australia) Taylor Ortlepp	July 1	Adelaide Lightning	Boston College Eagles (USA)	
(New Zealand) Kalani Purcell	July 1	Melbourne Boomers		
(United States) Alison Schwagmeyer	July 1	Sydney Uni Flames	Perth Lynx	
(Australia) Piper Dunlop	July 2	Bendigo Spirit	Bendigo Braves (VIC)	
(Australia) Maddison Allen	July 2	Perth Lynx		
(Australia) Courtney Woods	July 2	Townsville Fire	Northern Illinois Huskies (USA)	
(New Zealand) Antonia Farnworth	July 4	Melbourne Boomers		
(Australia) Rebecca Cole	July 6	Southside Flyers		
(New Zealand) Mary Goulding	July 8	Bendigo Spirit	IK Eos Lund (SWE)	
(Turkey) Funda Nakkaşoğlu	July 8	Sydney Uni Flames	Galatasaray S.K. (TUR)	
(Australia) Nes'eya Parker-Williams	July 9	Perth Lynx		
(Australia) Stephanie Reid	July 9	Townsville Fire	Southside Flyers	
(Australia) Sara Blicavs	July 10	Southside Flyers		
(New Zealand) Penina Davidson	July 11	Melbourne Boomers		
(Australia) Marena Whittle	July 14	Adelaide Lightning	Perth Lynx	
(Australia) Shelby Britten	July 15	Bendigo Spirit		
(Australia) Kiera Rowe	July 15	Sydney Uni Flames	Southside Flyers	
(Australia) Lara McSpadden	July 15	Townsville Fire	Sydney Uni Flames	
(New Zealand) Stella Beck	July 16	Melbourne Boomers		
(Australia) Jessie Edwards	July 16	Perth Lynx	Adelaide Lightning	
(Australia) Louella Tomlinson	July 21	Adelaide Lightning	Southside Flyers	
(Australia) Amelia Todhunter	July 22	Bendigo Spirit	Sandringham Sabres (VIC)	
(Australia) Aimie Clydesdale	July 22	Southside Flyers		
(Australia) Izzy Wright	July 23	Melbourne Boomers	Nunawading Spectres (VIC)	
(Australia) Alexandra Sharp	July 23	Perth Lynx	Wake Forest Demon Deacons (USA)	
(Australia) Shanae Greaves	July 23	Sydney Uni Flames		
(Australia) Rachel Brewster	July 30	Melbourne Boomers		
(Australia) Tayah Burrows	July 30	Perth Lynx		
(Australia) Natalie Burton	July 30	Sydney Uni Flames	Saint-Amand Porte du Hainaut (FRA)	
(United States) Mikaela Ruef	August 4	Canberra Capitals		
(Australia) Alicia Froling	August 5	Bendigo Spirit		
(Australia) Hope Terdich	August 5	Melbourne Boomers	Ringwood Hawks (VIC)	
(Australia) Carly Boag	August 6	Sydney Uni Flames	Espoo Basket (FIN)	
(Australia) Madeleine O'Hehir	August 13	Sydney Uni Flames		
(Australia) Liz Cambage	August 18	Southside Flyers	Shanxi Flame (CHN)	
(Australia) Leilani Mitchell	September 3	Southside Flyers		
(Australia) Jennie Rintala	September 9	Bendigo Spirit	Adelaide Lightning	
(Australia) Rebecca Pizzey	September 14	Southside Flyers		
(Australia) Georgia Pineau	September 16	Bendigo Spirit	Boston College Eagles (USA)	
(Australia) Stephanie Blicavs	September 18	Southside Flyers	Adelaide Lightning	
(Australia) Carlie Smith	September 23	Adelaide Lightning	Sunshine Coast Phoenix (QLD)	
(Australia) Ashleigh Isenbarger	September 24	Perth Lynx	Lakeside Lightning (WA)	
(Australia) Sharna Thompson	October 2	Townsville Fire	Hobart Phoenix (TAS)	
(Australia) Rachel Antoniadou	October 3	Melbourne Boomers	Nunawading Spectres (VIC)	
(Australia) Rachel Jarry	October 13	Southside Flyers	Sandringham Sabres (VIC)	
(Australia) Alex Wilson	October 15	Adelaide Lightning	Sydney Uni Flames	
(Australia) Abigail Wehrung	October 16	Adelaide Lightning	Bendigo Spirit	
(Australia) Monique Conti	October 20	Southside Flyers	Melbourne Boomers	
(New Zealand) Ashleigh Karaitiana	October 22	Melbourne Boomers	RedCity Roar (QLD)	
(Australia) Hannah Kaser	October 27	Canberra Capitals	Adelaide Lightning	
(Australia) Ella Batish	October 28	Adelaide Lightning	Frankston Blues (VIC)	
(United States) Kayla Steindl	October 29	Perth Lynx	Joondalup Wolves (WA)	
(Australia) Jade Melbourne	November 3	Canberra Capitals	Centre of Excellence (ACT)	
(Australia) Ashley Taia	November 3	Canberra Capitals	Logan Thunder (QLD)	
(Australia) Jewel Williams	November 5	Perth Lynx		
(Australia) Mackenzie Clinch Hoycard	November 6	Perth Lynx	Warwick Senators (WA)	
(Australia) Kelsey McDermott	November 6	Townsville Fire	Newberry Wolves (USA)	
(Australia) Emma Clarke	November 7	Perth Lynx	Colorado Buffaloes (USA)	
(Australia) Brooke Basham	November 10	Adelaide Lightning	Eastern Mavericks (SA)	
(Australia) Aimee Brett	November 10	Adelaide Lightning	Forestville Eagles (SA)	
(Australia) Morgan Yaeger	November 10	Adelaide Lightning	Oregon Ducks (USA)	

=== Released ===
Player	Date signed	Team	Reason	Ref
(Australia) Chelsea D'Angelo	July 15	Melbourne Boomers	Achilles injury	
(Australia) Maddison Allen	October 21	Perth Lynx	Mental health concerns	
(Australia) Alanna Smith	October 22	Adelaide Lightning	Ankle injury	
(Australia) Jasmin Fejo	October 24	Adelaide Lightning	Pregnancy	
(Australia) Sami Whitcomb	November 4	Perth Lynx	Family reasons	

=== Going overseas ===
Player	Date signed	New team	Former team	Ref
(Australia) Gemma Potter	November 14	UCLA Bruins (USA)	Canberra Capitals	
(Canada) Bridget Carleton	May 21	Landerneau Bretagne Basket (FRA)	Townsville Fire	
(United States) Ariel Atkins	May 31	İzmit Belediyespor (TUR)	Perth Lynx	
(Belgium) Julie Vanloo	June 27	Casademont Zaragoza (ESP)	Townsville Fire	
(Australia) Alice Kunek	June 30	Arka Gdynia (POL)	Sydney Uni Flames	
(United States) Rebecca Tobin	July 5	ACS Sepsi SIC (ROU)	Bendigo Spirit	
(United States) Mercedes Russell	July 10	Galatasaray S.K. (TUR)	Southside Flyers	
(Australia) Abby Bishop	July 23	Virtus Bologna (ITA)	Townsville Fire	

=== Retirement ===
Name	Date	Team(s) played (years)	Notes	Ref.
(Australia) Sarah Graham	December 27	Dandenong Rangers (2007–08); Logan Thunder (2008–2012, 2013–14); Sydney Uni Flames (2012–13, 2016–2020); West Coast Waves (2014–15)	WNBL Champion (2017); WNBL Rookie of the Year (2009)	
(Australia) Gabrielle Richards	January 24	Australian Institute of Sport (2002–2004); Bendigo Spirit (2007–2009, 2010–2018, 2019–20)	2x WNBL Champion (2013, 2014); 2x All-WNBL Team (2013, 2014); Also played college basketball.	
(Australia) Natalie Hurst	January 31	Canberra Capitals (1999–2003, 2005–2010, 2013–14, 2017–18); Bendigo Spirit (2018–19); Adelaide Lightning (2019–20)	7x WNBL Champion (2000, 2002, 2003, 2006, 2007, 2009, 2010); WNBL Grand Final Most Valuable Player (2009); Also played overseas in France, Hungary, Turkey & Poland.	
(United States) Jessica Kuster	July 10	Sydney Uni Flames (2019–20)	Also played college basketball and overseas in Romania, Czech Republic, Hungary & Italy.	

== See also ==
- List of 2020 WNBL team rosters
