= Hannah Lewis =

Australian basketball player

Personal information
- Born: 29 January 1984 (age 42)
- Listed height: 1.85 m (6 ft 1 in)
- Position: Forward

Career history
- ?: Canberra Capitals

Hannah Lewis (born 29 January 1984) is an Australian basketball player. She has joined a Women's National Basketball League (WNBL) team for the 2005/2006 season when she played for the Perth Lynx. She has subsequently played for the Canberra Capitals in the same league. She has also played for the Canberra Nationals in the Waratah League.

== Personal ==
Lewis She is 185 centimetres (73 in) tall.

== Basketball ==
Lewis played her junior basketball for the Sturt Sabres of South Australia. Lewis first played in the WNBL during the 2005/2006 season where she played for the Perth Lynx. She did not play in the WNBL during the 2006/2007 and 2007/2008 season.

Lewis joined the Canberra Capitals for the 2008/2009 season and continued to play for them during the 2009/2010 season, where she played the role of bench forward in a season when the club won the WNBL Championship. During the season, Lauren Jackson was quoted as saying the Capitals training was really intense because of players like Lewis. Lewis and her teammates watched the 2009/2010 preliminary final together, and made a bet amongst themselves as to who would win the game and with what score. Each player put in $2 AUD. Lewis won the bet. At the end of the season, Lewis attended a costume party at Marianna Tolo and Carly Wilson's house with the rest of her teammates to celebrate their WNBL Championship win.

Lewis was also a member of the Capitals 2010/2011 team. That season, in the pre-season, she played in the September 2010 game against the Sydney Uni Flames. At the beginning of the season, team captain Jessica Bibby said Lewis was one of the promising players on that season's team. At the end of the season, she was a free agent.

In 2010, Lewis played for the Canberra Nationals in the Waratah League. She was joined by several of her Canberra Capitals teammates including Lauren Jansen, Chantella Perera, Kellie Abrams and Nicki Graham. In the team's fourth victory of the season, a 62 to 53 win against the Hornsby Spiders, Lewis led the team with 20 points and 8 rebounds. In the Grand Final loss versus Bankstown Bruins, she scored 14 points.
