= Tanya Smith =

Tanya Smith may refer to:

- Tanya Smith (basketball) (born 1984), Australian basketball player
- Tanya M. Smith, evolutionary biologist
