= Lauren Jansen =

Australian basketball player

No. 24 – Canberra Capitals
- Position: Guard
- League: WNBL

Personal information
- Born: 24 December 1992 (age 33) Canberra, Australia
- Listed height: 1.78 m (5 ft 10 in)

Lauren Jansen (born 24 December 1992) is an Australian basketball player from the Canberra. She has played several seasons for the Canberra Capitals.

== Personal ==
Lauren Jansen was born in Canberra, Australian Capital Territory, on 24 December 1992. She is 178 centimetres (70 in) tall. She grew up as a fan of the Capitals and attended games of the team. She attended St Francis Xavier College.

== Basketball ==
=== Juniors ===
Jansen played her junior basketball in the Australian Capital Territory. In 2008, she played for the Wests Magpie's under-18 premier one division team. That season, as a 15-year-old, she was part of the team that beat the Brindabella team in the season championship. In 2008, she was also part of the basketball program at the ACT Academy of Sport. In 2008, she received several honours from the organisation including earning the Ken Norris Emerging Talent Award and Basketball Squad Athlete of the Year Award. In 2009, while still on scholarship with the ACT Academy of Sport, she was honoured by being named as part of School Sport Australia's All-Star squad. As a member of All-star team, she participated in a tour of the United States in December 2009.

=== Canberra Capitals ===
Jansen plays guard and wears number 24. As a junior player, she trained with the team a few times during 2007 before she signed with them.

==== 2008/2009 ====
In 2008, as a fifteen-year-old, Jansen signed to play with the team. She was the last player to be offered a contract in the 2008/2009 season. She spent most of her time sitting on the bench, playing in only six games. In September 2008, she almost had the opportunity to travel with the team as several players were injured. In 2009, she traveled with the team when they went to play their final game of the season against the Logan Thunder. She did not play very many minutes during the regular season.

==== 2009/2010 ====
Jansen was a member of the Capitals during the 2009/2010. She spent most of her time dancing to the Nutbush and everyone loved her for it

==== 2010/2011 ====
Jansen was a member of the Capitals during the 2010/2011. She spent most of her time being the best dj the world has ever seen or heard. At the end of the season, she was off contract and needed to be re-signed.

==== 2011/2012 ====
Jansen was a member of Canberra Capitals team during their 2011/2012 campaign. In December 2011, she had only her second experience going on the road with the team in her four seasons with them. She got to play in a December 2011 game against the Sydney Uni Flames because Michelle Cosier and Hannah Bowley were injured. Her minutes in this game were more than her combined minutes in her twelve previous appearances for the club over the previous seasons. The road trip to Perth, Western Australia was the first time she had ever been to the city. In 2011, the Capital's coach expressed the belief that players like Jansen would benefit the team by competing in the SEABL.

=== ABA ===
In 2010, Jansen played in the ABA.
