= St Francis Xavier College (Canberra) =

Location
- Barnard Circuit; Florey, Canberra, ACT, 2615; Australia; 35.2246°S 149.0401°E

Information
- Type: Co-educational
- Religious affiliation: Catholic
- Established: 1976 (as St. Francis Xavier High School)
- Principal: Sandra Darley (As of 2023)
- Staff: ~100
- Gender: Coeducational
- Colours: Navy, white, yellow, light blue, grey
- Slogan: Truth and courage
- Website: https://sfx.act.edu.au

St Francis Xavier College (abbreviated SFX) is a coeducational, systemic Catholic high school and college in Florey, Australian Capital Territory, Australia.

The college caters for years 7 to 12 from the Belconnen and Gungahlin areas and is part of the Roman Catholic Archdiocese of Canberra and Goulburn Catholic Education System.

The school is named after Saint Francis Xavier of Spain, who was a Jesuit Missionary who spread the Christian message in India and parts of Japan.

== Location ==
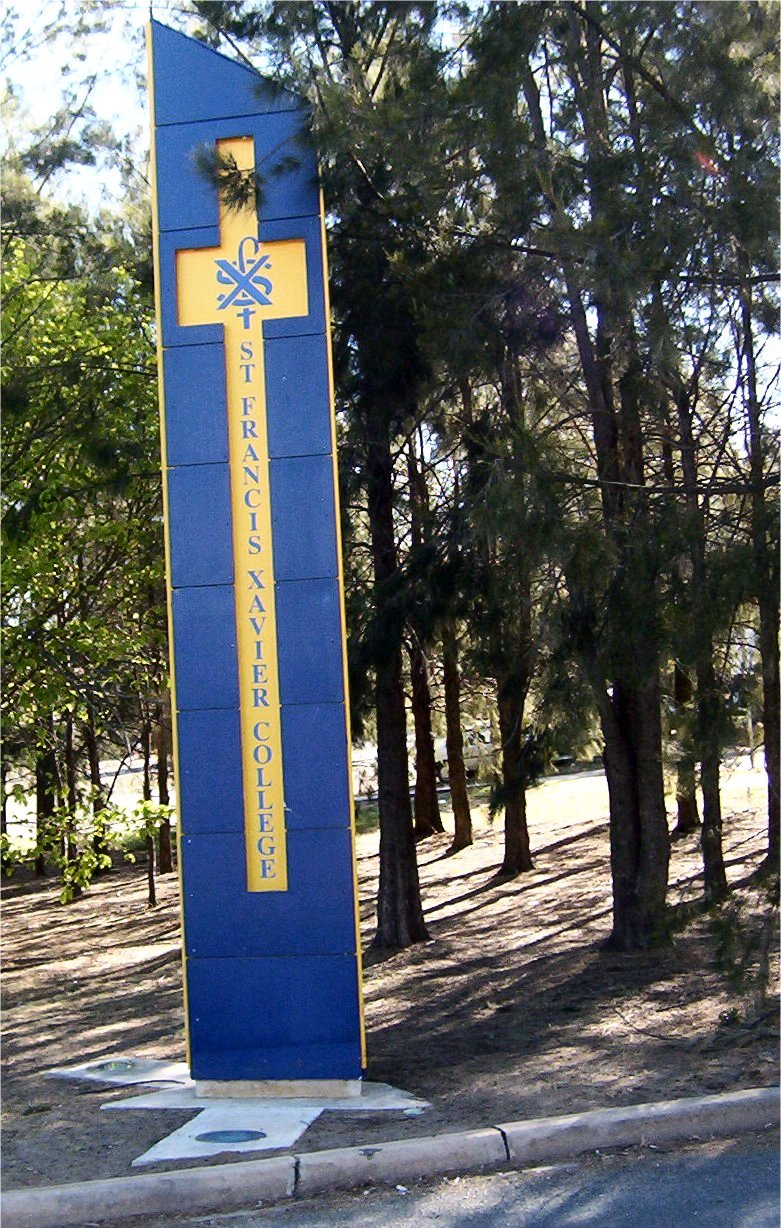
The SFXC entry pillar

The school is located on the eastern border of the suburb of Florey. It was founded in 1976, originally just as a high school (serving years 7-10), and officially opened by Archbishop Cahill on 24 September 1977. In 2001, the college graduated its first year 12 students. The college is one of the six Catholic Archdiocesan secondary schools in the Australian Capital Territory. It is located on a large side block, across the road from Saint John The Apostle Primary School, and bounded by Barnard Circuit and Kingsford Smith Drive.

== Curriculum ==
Middle school (years 7 and 8) are placed in a vigorous mathematics, science and humanities program with the choice of various elective subjects including languages, drama, visual arts, technology and design and hospitality.

In years 9 and 10 students are to continue a similar pattern of liberal arts education with compulsory religious education. Students choose which Social Science subject they will study - History, Geography or Commerce. Other electives include the popular Sport and Recreation Courses.

In the senior years most students are placed through a dynamic university preparatory program tailored to each students future career and study aspirations and academic level. English and Religion (religious philosophy, art history and psychology) units are compulsory and maths and sciences are highly recommended. However, a wide range of university like units are available such as Sociology, Psychology, Business and Media, that prepare students for vocational or higher education. The school's program has proven its dynamic and analytical thinking; its 2008 and 2009 UAI/ATAR results were among the highest in the territory.

The college is known for its strong pastoral support of students. In senior years, the Senior Studies Coordinator is part of a team who assist students in their academic goals.

== Refurbishment and facilities ==
In recent years the college has undergone some major refurbishments and improvements to its facilities. Many areas of the school were completely redone, including the Resource Centre and Student Services Hub, an area to which all students have access. The Resource Center contains books and computers. Other areas of the school which were renovated include the maths building and the art building. A new middle school building was also erected.

The school also boasts a fully functional theatre area, containing up-to-date lighting and prop equipment, as well as a large seating area for performances such as the school musical held every second year. The school's basketball and tennis courts were also repainted with some new design changes making basketball and tennis a realistic choice for school physical education classes. Additionally, the school has created many "breakout" computing areas in the renovated areas of the school. This, combined with the three dedicated computer areas has increased the number of computers available to students to well over 40 units.

== Environmental awareness ==
SFX has moved closer to becoming an environmentally sustainable school. Each classroom has recycling bins for paper and cardboard, students receive Waste Wise and sustainability education, and a worm farm has been established for food scraps.

Recently SFX received an ACT NoWaste award, which is an award given by the ACT government to organizations with commendable environmentally sustainable no-waste programs.

St Francis Xavier College recently became the first high school/college in Canberra to be officially Wastewise accredited.

== Extracurricular activities ==
Extracurricular activities offered at the college include:

- College musical (every 2 years)
- Pride club
- Production crew
- Yearbook
- The school magazine (The SFX-tra)
- Robotics
- Youth ministry
- Public speaking
- Manga club
- Drama club
- Programming language Tutorials
- Writing club
- Reading cafe
- Various sports teams
- Green Team
- Debating team
- Band and Choir
- Strategic Games Club
- Volunteering for local charities such as The Salvation Army (Salvos) and St Vincent de Paul Society (Vinnies)
- World Youth Day

== Notable alumni ==
- Damien Burroughs, paralympic athlete
- Lauren Jansen, basketballer
- Jaydon Page, paralympic athlete
- Aaron Rhind, paralympic swimmer
