= Aaron Rhind =

Australian Paralympic swimmer

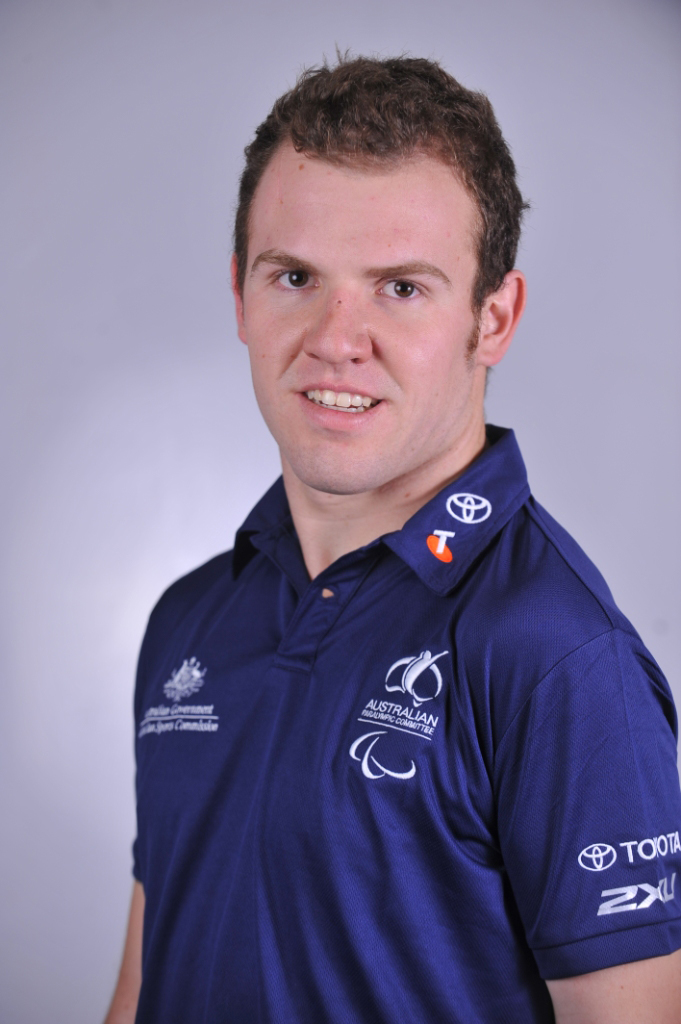
- 2012 Australian Paralympic team portrait of Rhind

Personal information
- Full name: Aaron Rhind
- Nationality: Australia
- Born: 13 February 1991 (age 35)

Sport
- Sport: Swimming
- Strokes: Freestyle, backstroke, butterfly, medley
- Classifications: S6, SB5, SM6
- Club: Ginninderra Marlins

Aaron Rhind (born 13 February 1991) is an Australian swimmer. He was selected to represent Australia at the 2012 Summer Paralympics in the 200 m individual medley and 50 m butterfly swimming events. He did not medal at the 2012 Games.

== Personal ==
Rhind was born on 13 February 1991 and is from Yass, New South Wales. His mother has multiple sclerosis. He had a ruptured cerebral aneurysm when he was ten years old, which largely affects the left side of his body. Prior to his stroke, he played rugby union. He went to high school at Canberra's St Francis Xavier College and Mount Carmel High School. He has a Certificate III in Childcare.

== Swimming ==
Rhind is an S6 classified swimmer competing in the 100 m freestyle, 100 m backstroke, 200 m individual medley and 50 m butterfly events. He trains with Australian Olympic swimming medalist Adam Pine at the Canberra International Swimming and Aquatic Centre, has a scholarship with the Australian Capital Territory Academy of Sport, and is a member of Ginninderra Marlins He listens to Kanye West's "Stronger" before he competes.

Rhind started competing in 2003 because contact sports were off limits based on doctor's advice. In early 2007, he swam in the S8 classification but was downgraded to S6 ahead of the 2007 ‘Day of Difference’ Junior Games, where he represented New South Wales. The change in classification meant that Rhind had to change his swimming technique as the classification allowed him to only use one arm to swim. He set a S6 100 m butterfly Australian record at the Junior Games. He tried to qualify for the 2008 Summer Paralympics but did not make it. He competed at the 2009 Australian Short Course Championships in the 100 metre butterfly event, where he set a world record that was 3.41 seconds faster than the previous one. He competed at six other events in the competition where he set personal best times.

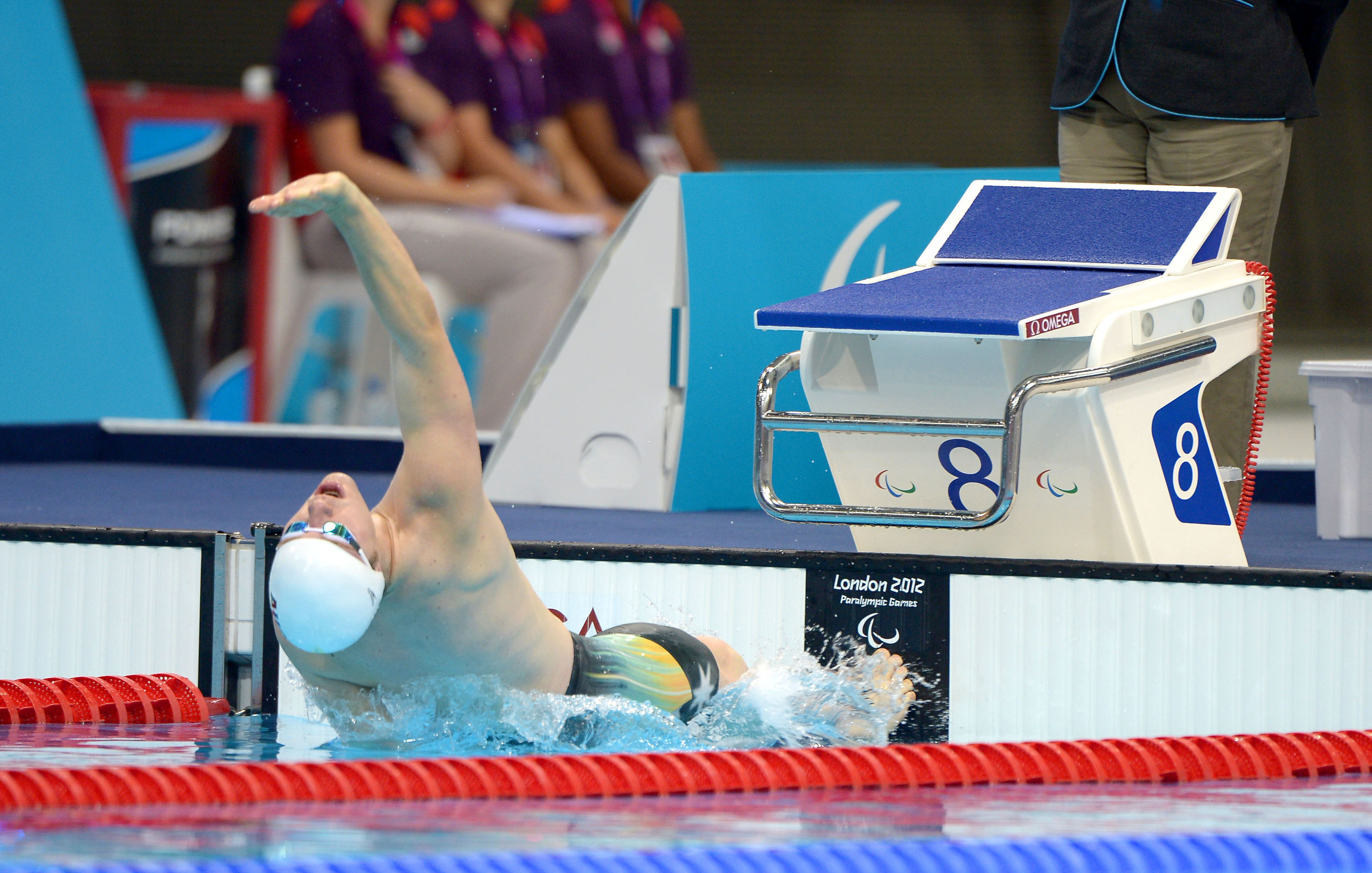
Rhind at the 2012 London Paralympics

Rhind first represented Australia in 2010. He represented Australia at the 2011 Arafura Games, winning two bronze medals and one silver medal. That year, he also competed at the Oceania Paralympic Championships and the German National Swimming Championships. In July 2012, he was formally selected to represent Australia at the 2012 Summer Paralympics in the 200 m individual medley SM6 and 50 m butterfly S6 events. He was scheduled to depart for London on 10 August. He did not medal at the 2012 Games.

=== Personal bests ===
Course	Event	Time	Meet	Swim date	Reference
Long	50 m Backstroke	41.34	2011 Telstra Australian Swimmi	1-Apr-11	
Long	100 m Backstroke	01:27.7	2011 Telstra Australian Swimmi	1-Apr-11	
Long	50 m Breaststroke	47.72	2012 NSW Country Championships-Individual	25-Feb-12	
Long	100 m Breaststroke	01:46.6	Canberra Christmas Classic	10-Dec-11	
Long	50 m Butterfly	33.76	2012 NSW Country Championships-Individual	26-Feb-12	
Long	100 m Butterfly	01:14.2	2012 EnergyAustralia Swimming Championships	21-Mar-12	
Long	50 m Freestyle	33.61	2012 NSW Country Championships-Individual	25-Feb-12	
Long	100 m Freestyle	01:14.8	2012 EnergyAustralia Swimming Championships	19-Mar-12	
Long	200 m Medley	03:01.4	2012 EnergyAustralia Swimming Championships	20-Mar-12	
Short	50 m Backstroke	39.65	2011 Australian Short Course Championships	3-Jul-11	
Short	100 m Backstroke	01:23.3	2010 Telstra Australian Short Course	14-Jul-10	
Short	50 m Breaststroke	45.57	2011 NSW Country SC Championships	9-Jul-11	
Short	100 m Breaststroke	01:42.7	2010 Telstra Australian Short Course	14-Jul-10	
Short	50 m Butterfly	33.42	2011 NSW Country SC Championships	10-Jul-11	
Short	100 m Butterfly	01:12.8	Ginninderra Winter Short Course Carnival 2011	26-Jun-11	
Short	50 m Freestyle	33.15	2011 NSW Country SC Championships	9-Jul-11	
Short	100 m Freestyle	01:12.6	2011 Australian Short Course Championships	1-Jul-11	
Short	100 m Medley	01:23.7	Ginninderra Winter Short Course Carnival 2011	26-Jun-11	
Short	200 m Medley	02:55.3	2011 Australian Short Course Championships	1-Jul-11	
