= Hannah Bowley =

Australian basketball player

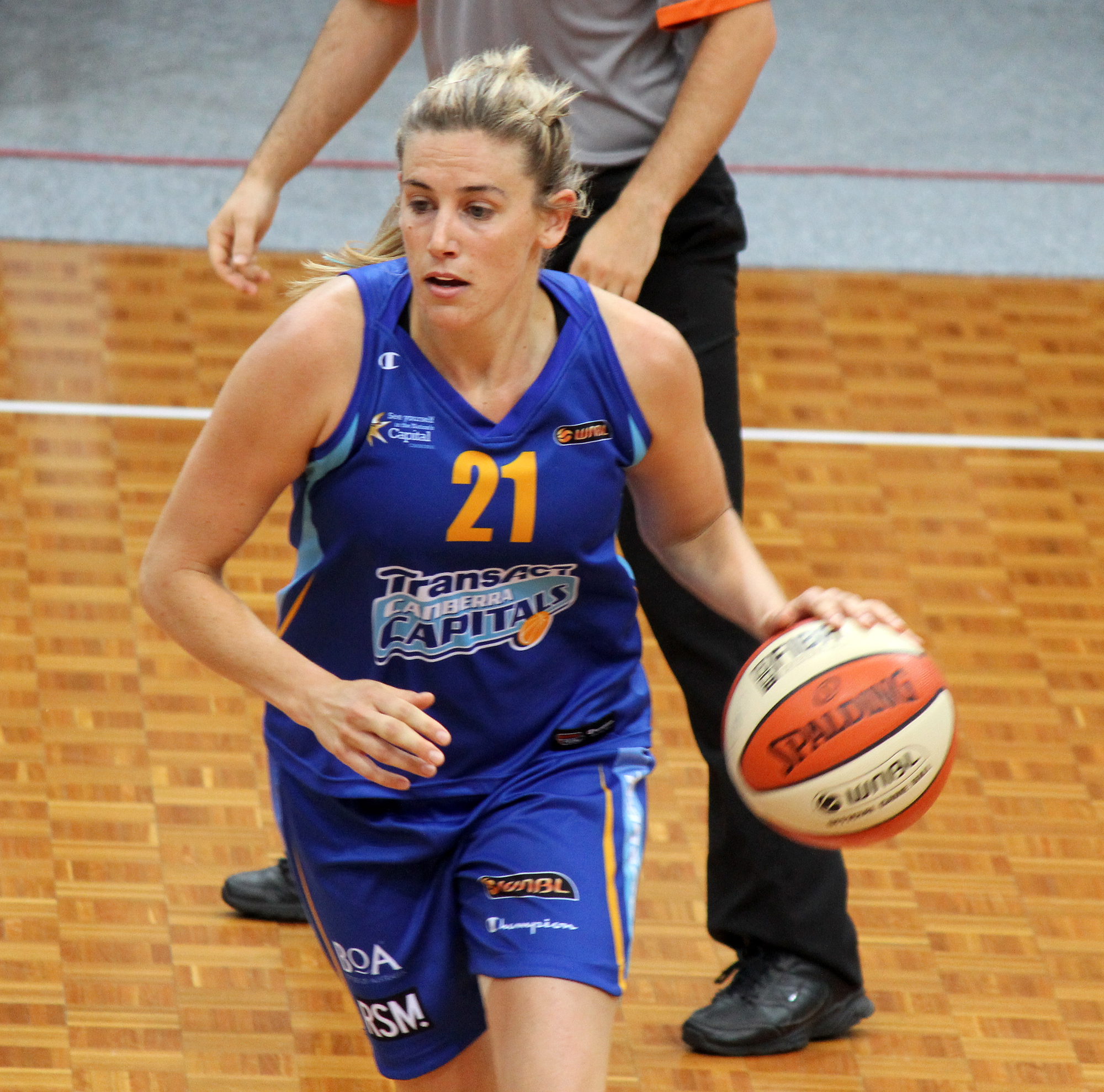
- Bowley during a game between the Capitals and Logan Thunder at AIS Arena

No. 21 – Canberra Capitals
- Position: Forward
- League: WNBL

Personal information
- Born: 29 January 1984 (age 42) Adelaide, South Australia, Australia
- Listed height: 1.85 m (6 ft 1 in)

Hannah Bowley (born 29 January 1984) is an Australian basketball player from South Australia, where she played junior basketball. She has played in the WNBL for two teams, the Perth Lynx and the Canberra Capitals. She has also played in the SEABL and the ABA.

== Personal ==
Hannah Bowley was born on 29 January 1984 in Adelaide, South Australia. She is 185 cm tall, plays forward and wears number 21. She has a sister who played for the WNBL's Adelaide Lightning in 2008/09. When not playing basketball, she plays Australian rules football.

== Basketball ==
=== Junior basketball ===
Bowley played junior basketball for South Australia's Sturt Sabres.

=== WNBL ===
==== West Coast Waves ====
Bowley played for the West Coast Waves in the 2005/06 season.

==== Canberra Capitals ====
===== 2008/2009 =====
Bowley played for the Canberra Capitals in the 2008/2009 season. She did not play very many minutes during the regular season. She was expected to help fill a void this season due to an early season injury to Michaela Dalgleish.

===== 2009/2010 =====
Bowley played for the Canberra Capitals in the 2009/2010 season.

===== 2010/2011 =====
Bowley hosted the team's Mad Monday celebration at the end of the 2010/2011 season. As of January 2011, Bowley had played 48 games in the WNBL and only scored three three-pointers. During the 2010/2011 season, she was the fourth centre/forward off the bench, playing behind Michelle Cosier, Suzy Batkovic and Marianna Tolo. In a January 2011 game against the West Coast Waves, she scored 13 points and was the team's second leading scorer, behind Jessica Bibby. During her time with the Capitals to this point, in an average game, she only touched the ball twice a game. She attended the 2010/2011 team award ceremony that took place at the end of the season before the finals. At the end of the season, she was off contract and needed to be resigned.

===== 2011/2012 =====
In the preparations for the 2011/2012 season, Bowley was seen as a good addition as a forward and team management believed she would compliment Marianna Tolo's play. She plays small forward. She was a member of the Canberra Capitals team during their 2011/2012 campaign. She had playing time during the team's November game against the West Coast Waves, where she played as a forward. She also played in the November match against the Australian Institute of Sport that was played in Albury, New South Wales. She played in the 13 November 2011 game against the West Coast Waves. In December 2011, she had a hamstring injury and could not play in a game against the West Coast Waves and the Adelaide Lightning. She was estimated to be unable to play for three weeks. Opposition players like Eleanor Sharp credited Bowley as being a player that matters coming off the Capitals bench.

===== 2012/2013 =====
Bowley has committed to play for the Capitals in 2012/2013.

==== SEABL ====
Bowley played for Gladstone in the SEABL in 2011. In one August game for the team, she scored 26 points and in another game she scored 21.

==== ABA ====
Bowley played for teams in the ABA, and won ABA Central Championships in 2002, 2006 and 2008.
