= Rebecca Haynes =

Australian basketball player

Personal information
- Born: 24 October 1984 (age 42)
- Position: Guard/Forward

Career history
- ?: Canberra Capitals
- ?: Logan Thunder

Rebecca Haynes (born 24 October 1984) is a basketball player from Australia.

== Personal ==
Haynes was born on 24 October 1984, and has two siblings, a brother and a sister. She is 185 centimetres (73 in) tall. During the 2010/2011 basketball season, she attended the Queensland University of Technology where she worked towards a degree in accounting. Prior to that, she had attended Daytona Beach Community College, Community College of Rhode Island and Jacksonville State University.

== Basketball ==
In basketball, she plays two different positions, guard and forward. She first played competitive basketball for the Southern Districts Spartans based in Queensland. She joined the WNBL for the 2008/2009 season as a member of the Logan Thunder and then continued playing for them in the 2009/2010 season. In her first season, she had an average of 2.8 points and 1.3 rebounds a game in 15 games played. Her second season showed improved numbers, where she had an average of 3.4 points per game and 2.9 rebounds per game while playing in 20 games. She switched teams and played for the Canberra Capitals for the 2010/2011 season. In an October 2010 game against the Sydney Uni Flames, she scored 8 points in the second quarter in a game that the Capitals came from behind to win, a win that her coach Carrie Graf gave Haynes significant credit for. At the end of the season, she did off contract and not on the roster to play for the Capitals during the 2011/2012 season. In 2011, Haynes was a member of the Gladstone team in the Queensland Basketball League. In a game that season, she came in second in scoring with 42 points, 8 points behind Capitals teammate Jessica Bibby who scored 50.

Haynes has played basketball for three university teams in the United States: Daytona Beach Community College, Community College of Rhode Island and Jacksonville State University. While attending the Community College of Rhode Island, she was named the student athlete of the year.
