= Mikaela Dombkins =

Australian basketball player and coach

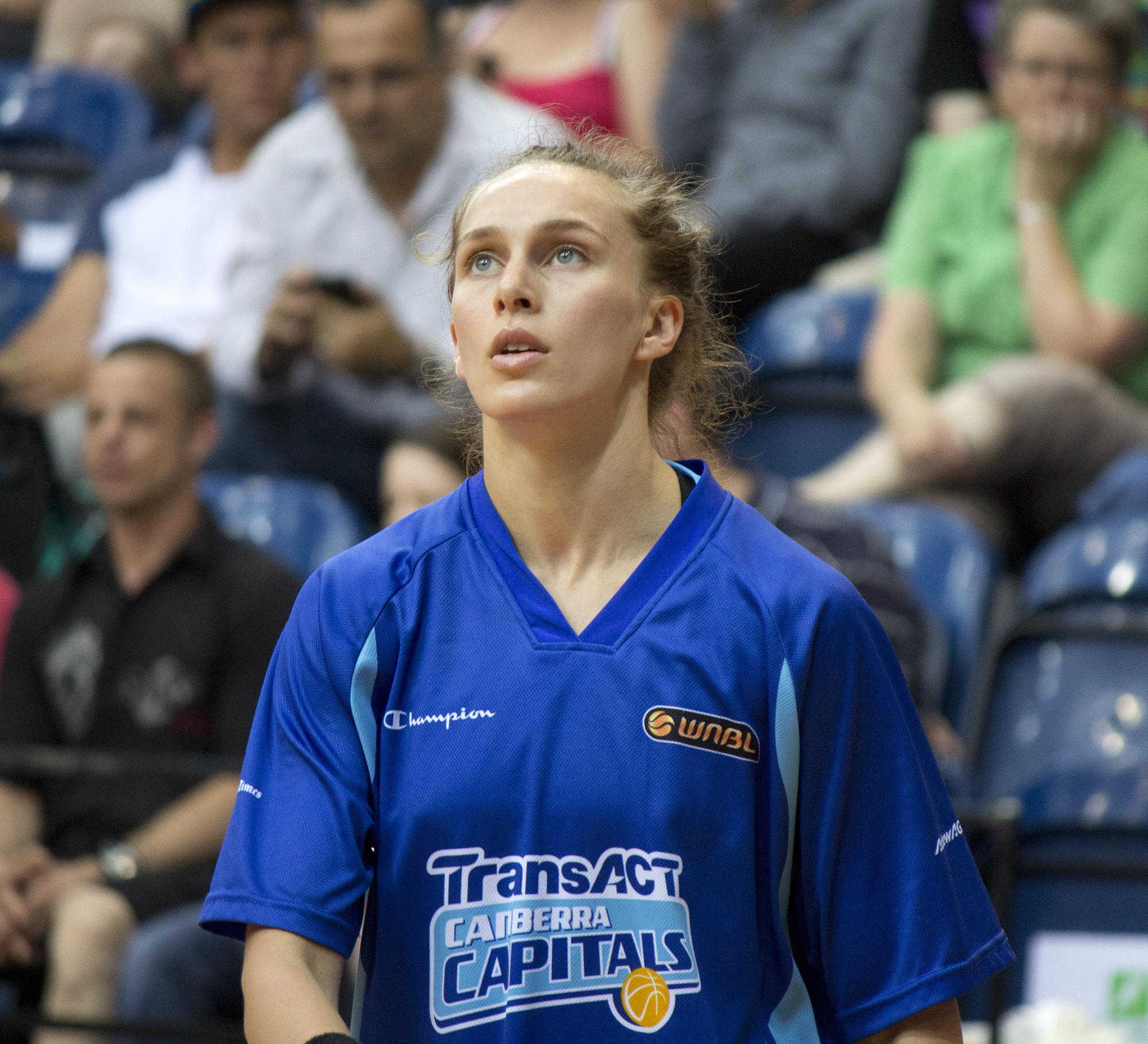
- Dombkins with the Canberra Capitals in 2012

Bendigo Spirit
- Title: Assistant coach
- League: WNBL

Personal information
- Born: 1 August 1986 (age 40) Newcastle, New South Wales
- Listed height: 181 cm (5 ft 11 in)

Career information
- Playing career: 2003–present
- Position: Guard
- Coaching career: 2021–present

Career history

Playing
- 2003–2006: Australian Institute of Sport
- 2006–2008: Sydney Uni Flames
- 2007: Manly Warringah Sea Eagles
- 2008: Maitland Mustangs
- 2009: Sandringham Sabres
- 2009–2011: Sydney Uni Flames
- 2010: Frankston Blues
- 2011: Maitland Mustangs
- 2011–2013: Canberra Capitals
- 2012: Canberra Nationals
- 2013: Waverley Falcons
- 2014: Sandringham Sabres
- 2015: Norths Bears
- 2015–2016: Adelaide Lightning
- 2019–2021: Newcastle Hunters
- 2021: Mackay Meteorettes

Coaching
- 2021–present: Bendigo Spirit

Career highlights
- 2× Waratah League champion (2019, 2021)

Mikaela Jayne Dombkins (born 1 August 1986) is an Australian professional basketball player and coach. She played 11 seasons in the Women's National Basketball League (WNBL) between 2003 and 2016. She currently serves as an assistant coach with the Bendigo Spirit of the WNBL.

== Early life ==
Dombkins was born in Newcastle, New South Wales. She played her junior basketball for the Maitland Mustangs.

== Professional career ==
=== Australian Institute of Sport (2003–2006) ===
Dombkins came to the Australian Institute of Sport (AIS) on a scholarship when she was 16. She played for the AIS WNBL team in the WNBL between 2003 and 2006. She endured knee and foot injuries during her time at the AIS. In October 2005, she scored 24 points against the Perth Lynx.

=== Sydney Uni Flames (2006–2008) ===
For the 2006–07 WNBL season, Dombkins joined the Sydney Uni Flames. She played two positions for the team, guard and forward. She left the Flames after the 2007–08 season.

=== Logan Thunder (2008–2009) ===
For the 2008–09 WNBL season, Dombkins joined the Logan Thunder. She did not make her debut for the Thunder after missing the season with a back injury.

=== Return to Sydney (2009–2011) ===
Dombkins returned to the Sydney Uni Flames for the 2009–10 WNBL season. In January 2010, she made a three-point shot to win the game against the Canberra Capitals. She missed the entire 2010–11 season with another back injury which almost ended her career.

=== Canberra Capitals (2011–2013) ===
Dombkins is one of several players warming up before a 15 October 2011 game against the Townsville Fire.

Dombkins joined the Canberra Capitals for the 2011–12 WNBL season. There were some concerns by team management about her potential performance ability because of the previous back injuries. The Capitals' coach said that Michelle Cosier's injury in the pre-season provided an opportunity to look at Dombkins as an option off the bench. She recorded 11 points and eight rebounds in her debut for the Capitals. In November 2012 against Sydney, she had 14 points and eight rebounds and was named player of the match.

In January 2013, Dombkins was ruled out for the rest of the 2012–13 season with a knee injury.

=== Adelaide Lightning (2015–2016) ===
In July 2015, after two seasons out of the league, Dombkins signed with the Adelaide Lightning for the 2015–16 WNBL season.

=== Off-season stints ===
In 2007, Dombkins played for the Manly Warringah Sea Eagles in the Waratah League. She continued on in the Waratah League with the Maitland Mustangs in 2008. In 2009, she played for the Sandringham Sabres in the South East Australian Basketball League (SEABL). She continued on in the SEABL for the Frankston Blues in 2010. In 2011, she returned for a season with the Maitland Mustangs. In 2012, she played for the Canberra Nationals in the SEABL. In 2013, she played for the Waverley Falcons in the Big V. She returned to the Sandringham Sabres in 2014. In 2015, she played for the Norths Bears in the Waratah League. Between 2019 and 2021, she played for the Newcastle Hunters and won a Waratah League championship in 2019. The Hunters were crowned champions in 2021 following the season's cancellation due to the COVID-19 pandemic. She finished the 2021 season with the Mackay Meteorettes of the NBL1 North.

== National team career ==
Dombkins represented Australia at the Under 19 World Championship for Women in Tunisia in 2005, and at the Under 21 World Championship for Women in Russia in 2007, where the team won silver.

== Coaching career ==
In November 2021, Dombkins joined the Bendigo Spirit as an assistant coach for the 2021–22 WNBL season.

== Personal life ==
After rupturing a disc in her back in 2010 forced her to take a break from basketball, she returned to modelling. She has appeared in Cleo magazine, Handle magazine and the Australian men's magazine Alpha. She earned a diploma in fashion design, and has specialised in designing her own swim wear.

Dombkins' partner is former WNBA player Leilani Mitchell.
