= Alicia Poto =

Australian basketball player

Sydney Uni Flames
- Position: Guard
- League: WNBL

Personal information
- Born: 28 March 1978 (age 48)
- Listed height: 1.66 m (5 ft 5 in)
Medals
Representing Australia
Olympic Games
| Silver medal – second place | 2004 Athens | Team competition |

Alicia Poto (born 28 March 1978) is an Australian basketball player. She has played in the Women's National Basketball League for the Australian Institute of Sport and Sydney Uni Flames. After a contract with a Czech basketball team fell through, she played basketball in Siberia. She is a member of the Australia women's national basketball team and won a medal with them at the 2004 Summer Olympics. She was considered for the 2008 and 2012 national teams to compete at the Olympics but did not make the final squads selected for the Games.

== Personal ==
Alicia Poto, nicknamed Potsy, was born on 28 May 1978. She is 166 centimetres (65 in) tall. In 2009, she was recovering from a hamstring injury.

== Basketball ==
Poto is a guard. She specialised as a point guard.

=== WNBL ===
Poto had a scholarship with the Australian Institute of Sport (AIS) and played for the AIS WNBL team in 1996.

Poto was a member of the Sydney Uni Flames during the 2006/2007, 2007/2008, 2008/2009 and 2011/2012 seasons. She played in a game against the Canberra Capitals in October 2007 that her team won 112–102 in a double overtime. She finished the game with 22 points. Following the victory, teammates Natalie Porter and Alicia Poto, along with opposition player Lauren Jackson shaved the head of Kristen Veal. The head shaving was part of a fundraiser for the Leukaemia Foundation. She came into the 2007 season in much better physical condition. She also began to take more of a leadership role on the team. Her team won its first five games this season. The team's coach suggested Poto was motivated to improve this season because she wanted to make the 2008 Olympic Team. In the 2008/2009 season, she missed a key three-pointer for the Flames in a game against the Adelaide Lightning that would have won the game for the Flames if she had made it. Her shot hit the rim but did not go in. In another game that season, she scored 37 points and had 5 assists in a game against the Townsville Fire. The 37-point week was rewarded with being named the WNBL Player of the Week. She rejoined and played for the Sydney Uni Flames in 2011/2012. Previously, she had conflicts with the team's head coach Karen Dalton but the pair managed to reconcile their differences. In an October 2011 game against the Logan Thunder, she scored 16 points, sinking 4 of her 5 attempted three-pointers. In a pre-season game against the Canberra Capitals, she scored 13 points.

=== National team ===
Poto was a member of the 1999 Australian senior women's team. As a member of the 2003 senior team, she competed in the FIBA Oceania Championship Series. She was a member of the Australian senior team that won a silver medal at the 2004 Summer Olympics. She was a member of the 2005 Opals.

In March 2007, Poto was named to the national team what would prepare for the 2008 Summer Olympics and was part of the team that won a gold medal at the 2008 Oceania World Qualifications series. She participated in the Good Luck Beijing 2008 event held in China in the lead up to the Olympics. Her team was joined by national teams from United States, Cuba, Korea, New Zealand and China. She was one of the last players to be cut from the national team before they departed for the 2008 Summer Olympics.

Poto played in a three-game test series against China in 2009. She played as a point guard. Her team lost a game in Geelong, where Poto had to leave the game because of a tight hamstring. On 2 September 2009, she played in the Canberra hosted return game against New Zealand in the Oceania Championship. She was on the shortlist to compete at the 2010 World Championships for Australia but was ultimately cut from the squad that went to the competition. She was a member of the Opals in 2011. She was named to the 2012 Australia women's national basketball team.

Poto has also represented Australia on the junior level. She was a member of the 1997 Australian Junior Women's Team that won a silver medal at the World Championships in Brazil and a member of the 1998 Australian Junior Women's team that won a bronze medal at the William Jones Cup in Taiwan.

== See also ==
- WNBL Defensive Player of the Year Award
