= Tanya Smith (basketball) =

Australian basketball player

Personal information
- Born: 12 December 1984 (age 41) Sydney
- Listed height: 1.90 m (6 ft 3 in)

Career information
- College: University of Hawaii at Manoa
- Position: Forward
- Number: 33

Tanya Smith (born 12 December 1984) is an Australian basketball player who played NCAA Division I at the University of Hawaii at Manoa in the Women's National Basketball League for Townsville Fire, Sydney University Flames and a short stint for Canberra Capitals. Tanya was a member of the Australian University National Basketball Team of the 2007 Summer Universiade held Thailand where Australia won Gold Medal.

== Personal life ==
Smith now Tanya Pentti was born in Sydney on 12 December 1984. She was married in 2019 in Palm Beach, New South Wales.

== Basketball ==
=== Juniors ===
Smith played juniors and Waratah Basketball League for Sutherland Sharks. Smith was ranked 3 in the league's total rebounds in 2004. In 2010/11 was in the All-Star 5.

=== NCAA ===
Smith received a full-ride scholarship to the University of Hawaii at Manoa playing season 2004–2008 making her most noticeable impact in season 2006/2007, 2007/2008.

Smith was the only player in the 2007–2008 season to start all 30 games. Smith was named 2007–2008 All-Western Athletic Conference Second Team, All-Wac Defensive Team, Pre-Season All-Wac selection, WAC player of the week 3 times, All-Tournament Waikiki Beach Marriott Resort Classic, All-Tournament Team Island Imaging Paradise Classic. She had 20 double-doubles 07/08 season. Smith set a regular-season WAC recorder with 25 rebounds against Idaho and tied her record with 25 points against Boise State. 2006–2007 Season Smith recorded nine double-doubles for the season, was named all-WAC first-team selection. She led the team in rebounds and field goal percentage. Her honors included 2006 Bank of Hawaii Invitational and WAC Player of the Week and 2006–07 all-WAC first team.

=== WNBL ===
Smith signed with Townsville Fire in the WNBL in 2008 and played seasons 2008/2009, 2009/2010 Sydney University Flames 2010/2011 before retiring due to a foot injury. In 2015 Smith returned for a short contract with the Canberra Capitals Smith averaged 5.2 points and 5 rebounds per game in 24 games for Townsville. Tanya holds the second-highest all-time offensive rebounds with 16 offensive boards. She made her biggest impact in the league with her offensive rebounds.

In 2009/2010, Smith averaged 9.9 points, 9.6 rebounds (4.8 offensive) and 2.3 assists in the regular season. Stats cite SportsTG Tanya Smith pulled down a career-high 21 rebounds for Townsville against Canberra Capitals as well as blocked six shots and making 10 points in November 2009

=== International games ===
Smith first played for Australia at 2007 Summer Universiade Thailand where the Australian Women's Basketball Team won gold.
