= Natalie Hurst =

Australian basketball player

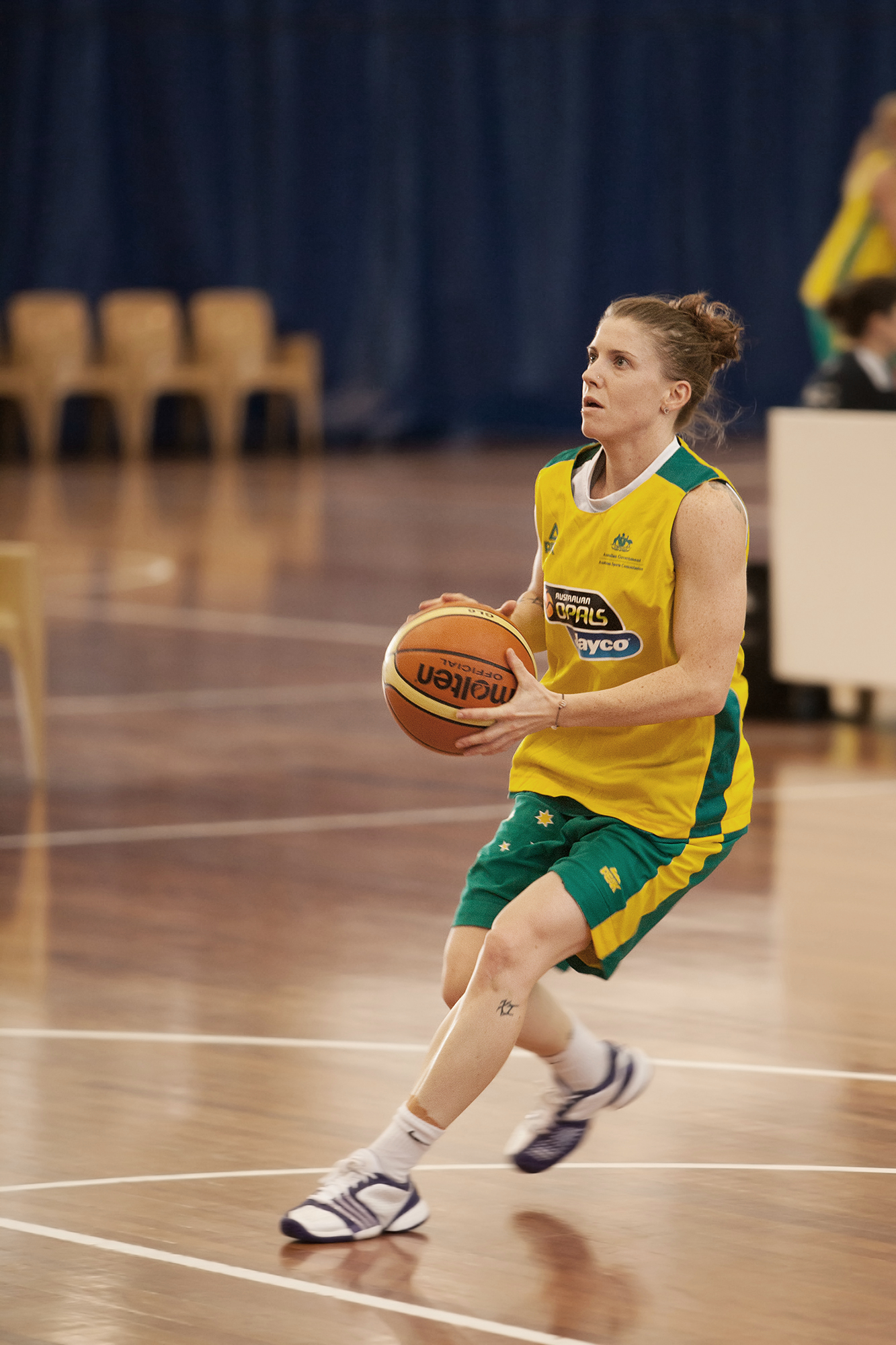
- Hurst at an Opals training camp

Personal information
- Born: 8 April 1983 (age 43) Australian Capital Territory, Australia
- Listed height: 1.63 m (5 ft 4 in)
- Position: Guard

Natalie Hurst (born 8 April 1983) is an Australian basketball player. She played junior basketball in Canberra and went on to play for the Canberra Capitals in the WNBL. With the Capitals, she won league championships in 1999/2000, 2001/2002, 2002/2003, 2005/2006, 2006/2007, 2008/2009 and 2009/2010. In 2011/2012, she played for the French club, Aix en Provence. She is a member of the Australia women's national basketball team, with her first national team cap in 2009. She won a gold medal in 2009 at the FIBA Oceania Women's Championships. She is a member of the 2012 national team.

== Personal ==
Hurst was born on 8 April 1983 in the Australian Capital Territory. She is 163 centimetres (5 ft 4 in) tall.

== Basketball ==
Hurst is a guard, specializing as a point guard. She played junior basketball in Canberra.

In June 2008, she played for the Launceston Tornadoes in the South East Australian Basketball League (SEABL) where she was the team's star player. In June 2008, she was suspended from basketball entirely for five weeks, with another five weeks applicable if the board received reports of further misconduct, for swearing at a referee. The incident occurred in a match between Somerset and Devonport in the North West Basketball Union (NWBU). She appealed the decision. Her teammates who came from outside the region to play debated boycotting practice in order to support her and express their unhappiness at the length of her ban. Lou Cox, the league's president, urged them not to: "I think that would be a very short sighted and poor response. All players that play the game, whether in the NWBU or the SEABL or the WNBL would be aware of the code of conduct." An independent tribunal reduced the sentence to five weeks in late June, and only for NWBU games; four of these weeks would only apply if further misconduct occurred within a year's time. This allowed Hurst to continue playing with the SEABL Tornadoes without interruption, and to return to Somerset after one week.

In 2009, she played for the Gladstone Port City Power in the Queensland Basketball League with Capitals teammate Jessica Bibby. She helped guide her team to a QBL championship, the first in the team's history. In 2010, she was named to the Queensland Basketball League's All-Star Five. She was also a member of the Power in 2010 and 2011. She was named the player of the week in Round Three.

=== WNBL ===
Hurst has played for the Canberra Capitals and was with the team for the 1999/2000, 2000/2001, 2001/2002, 2002/2003, 2005/2006, 2006/2007, 2007/2008, 2008/2009, and 2009/2010 seasons. Her team won the WNBL Grand Final in 2001/2002, 2002/2003, 2005/2006, 2006/2007, 2008/2009 and 2009/2010. They were runners up in 2000/2001. In the 2008/2009 game, she was named the Grand Final MVP. In the preliminary final against the Sydney Uni Flames for the 2009/2010 campaign, she scored 18 points with 15 of them coming from five three-pointers.

During the 2006/2007 regular season, Hurst averaged 8.9 points per game. She played in a game against the Sydney Uni Flames in October 2007 that her team lost 112–102. In a January 2008 63–57 win for the Capitals against the Dandenong Rangers, she scored 20 points. She had a calf injury in early 2009 and missed three games. In a January 2009 game against the AIS, she scored 17 points in the team's 87–51 victory. In a late January 2009 game against the AIS which Canberra won 99–72, she scored 15 points. In a January 2009 game against the Logan Thunder that Canberra won 76–53, she scored 11 points.

=== Europe ===
She signed with the French club, Aix en Provence in 2011 and played for them during the 2011/2012 season. In a September 2011 game, she scored 7 points in the third quarter against Villeneuve d'Ascq. She finished the game with 24 points, 4 rebounds, and 8 assists. Her team lost the game 91–94, the third game of the regular season.

=== National team ===
Hurst was a member of the 2009 Australian women's senior national team and earned her first cap with the national team in 2009 in a series against China which Australia won 2 games to 1. She played in the third game and was expected to step up because Alicia Poto was injured. On 2 September 2009, she played in the Canberra hosted return game against New Zealand in the Oceania Championship. She won a gold medal in 2009 at the FIBA Oceania Women's Championships. She was a member of the 2010 and 2011 Opals squad. She played in September 2011 three game test series against New Zealand. She was named to the 2012 Opals. She missed the first training camp in March 2012 for the 2012 Summer Olympics campaign because she was playing club basketball in Europe. She was scheduled to participate in the national team training camp held from 14 to 18 May 2012 at the Australian Institute of Sport.

Hurst has played 17 games for Australia's junior national team. She played her first international representing Australia in 2003, though she was part of the 2000 and 2001 Australia women's national under-19 team called the Gems. In 2007, she represented Australia at the World University Games where she earned a gold medal.

== Coaching career ==
Hurst served as assistant coach of the Adelaide Lightning in the WNBL between 2020 and 2022. She was elevated to head coach in May 2022 and served in the position until parting ways with the Lightning in December 2024.

In July 2025, Hurst was appointed lead assistant coach of the UC Capitals for the 2025–26 WNBL season.
