= Tracy Gahan =

American basketball player

Tracy Phillips
Personal information
- Born: July 18, 1980 (age 46) McKinney, Texas, U.S.
- Listed height: 6 ft 2 in (1.88 m)

Career information
- High school: McKinney (McKinney, Texas)
- College: Iowa State (1998–2002)
- WNBA draft: 2002: 3rd round, 46th overall pick
- Drafted by: New York Liberty
- Playing career: 2003–2011
- Position: Forward

Career history
- 2003–2004: Peiraikos
- 2004–2005: Panathinaikos
- 2005–2006: DCU Mercy
- 2006–2009: Adelaide Lightning
- 2007: Botaş SK
- 2009–2010: Pruszków
- 2010: Leszno
- 2010–2011: Dandenong Rangers

Career highlights
- WNBL champion (2008); A1 Ethniki champion (2005); WNBL All-Star Five (2008)
- Stats at Basketball Reference

Tracy Phillips (née Gahan) (born July 18, 1980) is an American retired professional basketball player.

== Career ==
=== College ===
In college, Phillips attended Iowa State University in Ames, Iowa.

=== Iowa State statistics ===
Legend
| GP | Games played | GS | Games started | MPG | Minutes per game |
| FG% | Field goal percentage | 3P% | 3-point field goal percentage | FT% | Free throw percentage |
| RPG | Rebounds per game | APG | Assists per game | SPG | Steals per game |
| BPG | Blocks per game | PPG | Points per game | **Bold** | Career high |

| Year | Team | GP | Points | FG% | 3P% | FT% | RPG | APG | SPG | BPG | PPG |
|---|---|---|---|---|---|---|---|---|---|---|---|
| 1998–99 | Iowa State | 31 | 240 | 46.1% | 31.5% | 69.6% | 5.4 | 2.6 | 1.2 | 0.5 | 7.7 |
| 1999-00 | Iowa State | 33 | 219 | 45.1% | 40.0% | 77.1% | 4.7 | 3.3 | 1.1 | 0.2 | 6.6 |
| 2000–01 | Iowa State | 33 | 407 | **53.2%** | **45.6%** | 79.5% | 7.5 | 2.8 | 1.0 | **0.4** | 12.3 |
| 2001–02 | Iowa State | 33 | **491** | 48.3% | 43.9% | **82.8%** | **7.6** | **4.1** | **1.9** | 0.4 | **14.9** |
| Career | | 130 | 1357 | 48.7% | 42.0% | 77.7% | 6.3 | 3.2 | 1.3 | 0.4 | 10.4 |

=== WNBA ===
After her college career, Phillips was picked 46th overall by the New York Liberty in the 2002 WNBA draft. However, she was soon released. After strong showings during her championship season in Australia, Phillips was invited to the Connecticut Sun's training camp before the 2008 WNBA season. Gahan was released before the season began.

=== Europe ===
After spending an additional year at college to complete her degree, Phillips began her career in Greece. In 2003, she spent her first season with Peiraikos, before moving to Panathinaikos for her second season in A1 Ethniki Women's Basketball. In 2005, Phillips travelled west to Ireland, playing for DCU Mercy in the Irish Women's Super League. After a season away, she returned in 2007 after her Australian season concluded, signing with Botaş SK for the conclusion of the Turkish season.

After three years in Australia, Phillips played for PTS Lider Pruszków in Poland's Basket Liga Kobiet. Towards the end of the 2009–10 season, she switched to Tęcza Leszno for the remainder of her time in Poland.

=== Australia ===
In 2006, Phillips signed with the Adelaide Lightning to play in the Women's National Basketball League, Australia's premier women's league and the strongest league in the southern hemisphere. In her second season with the Lightning, Phillips was awarded a place in the WNBL All-Star Five for 2007–08. The Lightning would also go on to take home the 2007–08 WNBL Championship. She returned to the league in 2010, signing with the Dandenong Rangers.

== Personal life ==
Phillips is married to former Adelaide Lightning teammate, WNBA player and Australian Olympian, Erin Phillips, and took her surname. They have four children, twins Blake and Brooklyn born in November 2016, Drew, born in July 2019, and London Skye, born in 2023. However, in 2022, days before Erin was due to play an AFLW preliminary final, Tracy suffered a miscarriage.
