= Lisa Pardon =

New Zealand basketball player

Personal information
- Born: 22 May 1982 (age 44)
Medal record
Women's basketball
Representing New Zealand
Commonwealth Games
Silver medal – second place	2006 Melbourne	Team competition

Lisa Renata Pardon (born 22 May 1982 in Auckland, New Zealand) is a basketball player for New Zealand. At the 2006 Commonwealth Games she won a silver medal as part of the Tall Ferns New Zealand women's basketball team.

She currently plays for the Bulleen Boomers women's basketball team, and was acknowledged as having the Best 3-point Shooting Percentage in the WNBL for the 2008/09 season.
