= Natalie Porter =

Australian basketball player

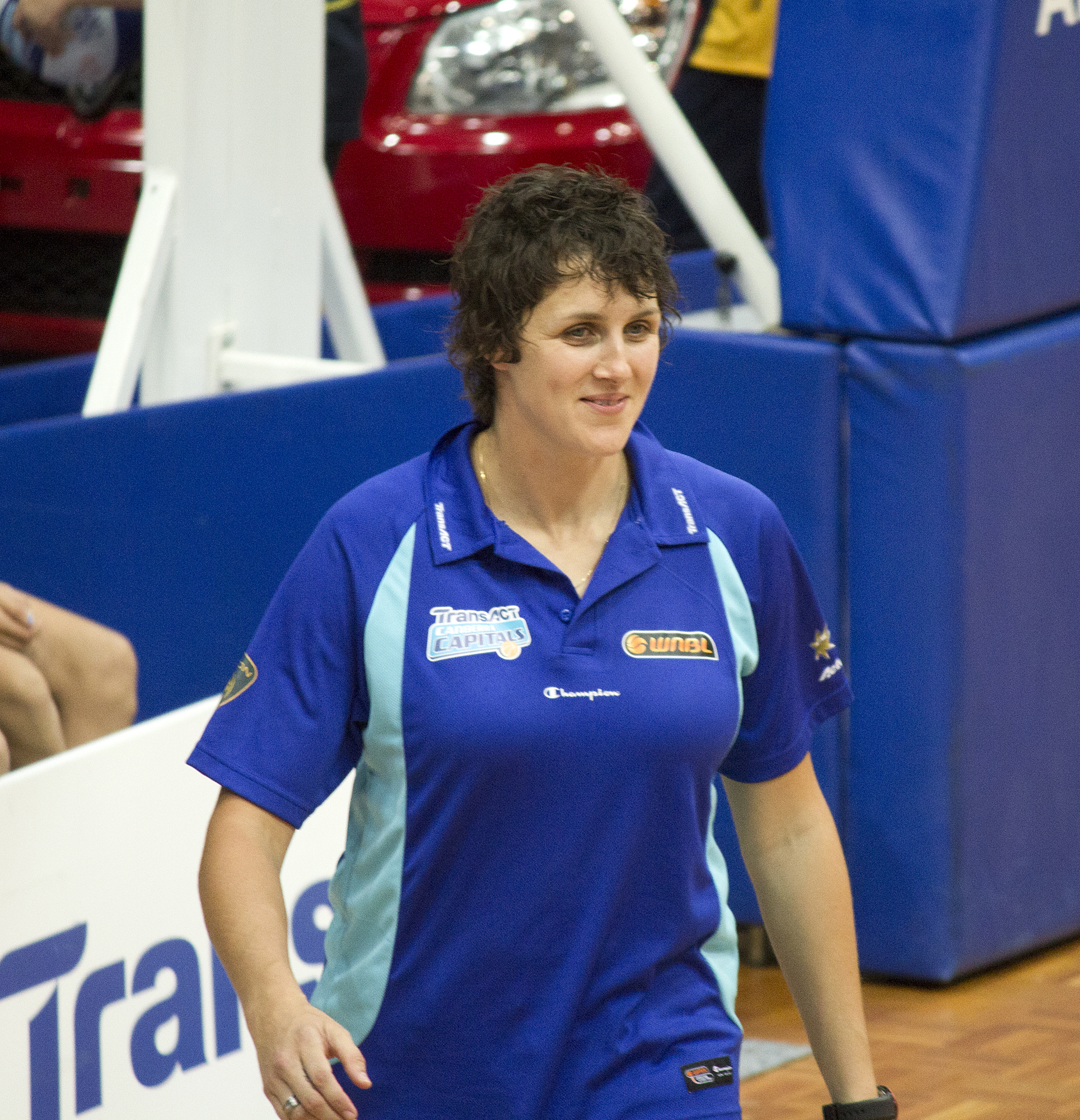
- Natalie Porter during a Capitals game at AIS Arena

Personal information
- Born: 16 December 1980 (age 45) Melbourne, Victoria
- Listed height: 185 cm (6 ft 1 in)

Career information
- WNBA draft: 2000: 4th round, 61st overall pick
- Drafted by: New York Liberty
- Playing career: 1996–2012
- Position: Forward

Career history
- ?: Australian Institute of Sport, Dandenong Rangers, Townsville Fire, Sydney Uni Flames, Lavezzini Parma
- Stats at Basketball Reference
Medals
Representing Australia
Women's basketball
Olympic Games
Silver medal – second place	2004 Athens	Women's basketball

Natalie Porter (born 16 December 1980) is an Australian basketball player who played for the Australian national team and became an Olympic medalist. In her home country, she has played for four different top-level teams including the Dandenong Rangers, Townsville Fire, Sydney Uni Flames and Canberra Capitals. In 2000, she was drafted by the Women's National Basketball Association. She has also played basketball in Italy. She has been a member of the Australia women's national basketball team (the Opals), and won a silver medal at the 2004 Summer Olympics in Athens as a member of the team.

== Personal life ==
Natalie Porter was born in Melbourne, Victoria on 16 December 1980. She is 185 centimetres (73 in) tall.

== Basketball ==
=== WNBL ===
Porter started playing basketball when she was five years old. In 1996, she was at the Australian Institute of Sport as a basketball scholarship holder.

In 1997, Porter joined the Dandenong Rangers, a team in the Women's National Basketball League (WNBL). In 2003, she moved to the Townsville Fire, where she was the team captain. That year, she was named the Robyn Maher Defensive Player of the Year, and a member of the WNBL All-Star Five. She was with the team again in 2004, remaining as captain.

Porter played for the Sydney Uni Flames in 2006, where she earned the Sydney Uni Players' Player award. In a February 2007 game against the Canberra Capitals, she scored 19 points. In the season's Grand Final that her team lost, she scored 15 points against the Canberra Capitals. In 2007/2008, Porter played for the team again. The Sydney Morning Herald described her as one of the team's stars. In a December 2007 game, she scored 41 points against the Capitals. In a January 2008 game, she scored 25 points. She topped off the season by being named the MVP. In 2009, she was named the team's captain after returning from playing in Italy. In an October 2009 game for Sydney, she scored 21 points. In another game that month, she scored 19 points and had 10 rebounds.

Porter is one of several players warming up before a 15 October 2011 game against the Townsville Fire.

Porter takes the floor to relieve Tolo during a 15 October 2011 game against the Townsville Fire.

In 2011/2012, Porter played for the Canberra Capitals in the forward position wearing the number 40. In the fourth round loss to the Adelaide Lightning, she was largely responsible for guarding and shutting down Suzy Batkovic. In late November, she left for a while and was scheduled to return in early 2012, because she had obligations related to her work that she could not back out of. The 13 November 2011 game against the West Coast Waves was her final game before a break as a result of having to go to the United States for work. She had seven assists in the game.

=== WNBA ===
In 2000, Porter was drafted in the fourth round of the WNBA draft and was the 61st pick. She was drafted by the New York Liberty.

=== Italian A1 ===
In 2008, Porter signed a contract to play with Lavezzini Parma. She played for the team in 2009.

=== National team ===
Porter first played for Australia as a member of the Australian junior team. She played for the team in 1996 and 1997, was a member of the senior national team by 2002, and completed a tour of China with the team. In 2003, she was a member of the senior national team that toured Europe. She was a member of the women's national basketball team that won a silver medal at the 2004 Summer Olympics, and the 2005 and 2006 national teams. She was also a member of the 2007 national team, which lost in September to China after having gone undefeated for close to a year. She had seven rebounds in the game. In 2008, she was part of the national team, but in April of that year, she had an ankle injury.

== See also ==
- WNBL Defensive Player of the Year Award
