= Abby Bishop =

Australian basketball player (born 1988)

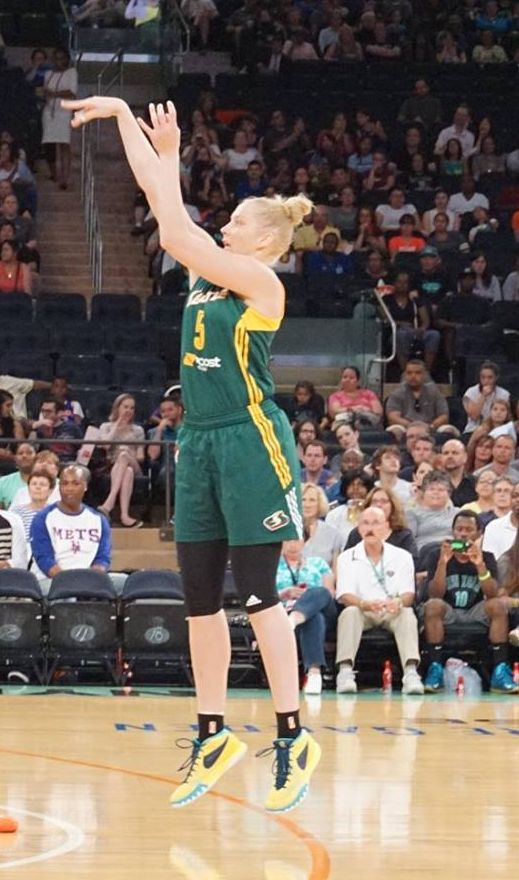
- Bishop in Madison Square Garden in 2015

Personal information
- Born: 29 November 1988 (age 37) Booleroo, South Australia, Australia
- Listed height: 189 cm (6 ft 2 in)

Career information
- Playing career: 2005–2025
- Position: Forward

Career history
- 2005–2006: Australian Institute of Sport
- 2006–2010: Canberra Capitals
- 2010: Seattle Storm
- 2010–2011: Dandenong Rangers
- 2011: Kilsyth Cobras
- 2011–2012: Adelaide Lightning
- 2012–2013: Perpignan Basket
- 2013–2016: Canberra Capitals
- 2014: PEAC-Pecs
- 2014: Launceston Tornadoes
- 2015: Aluinvent DVTK Miskolc
- 2015–2016: Seattle Storm
- 2016–2017: Tarbes Gespe Bigorre
- 2017: Rockhampton Cyclones
- 2017–2018: Adelaide Lightning
- 2018: WBC Dynamo Novosibirsk
- 2018: Sunshine Coast Phoenix
- 2018–2019: KSC Szekszárd
- 2019: Rockhampton Cyclones
- 2019: Townsville Flames
- 2019–2020: Townsville Fire
- 2020: Spar Citylift Girona
- 2020–2021: Virtus Bologna
- 2021: Ipswich Force
- 2021–2023: Southside Flyers
- 2022: Casey Cavaliers
- 2023–2024: Hozono Global Jairis
- 2024: Sichuan Yuanda Meile
- 2025: Canberra Capitals

Career highlights
- Hungarian Cup winner (2014); Hungarian Cup MVP (2014); WNBA champion (2010); 3× WNBL champion (2007, 2009, 2010); WNBL Most Valuable Player (2015); 2× WNBL All-Star Five (2009, 2015); WNBL Rookie of the Year (2006)
- Stats at WNBA.com
- Stats at Basketball Reference
Medals
Basketball
Representing Australia
Olympic Games
Bronze medal – third place	2012 London	Team
FIBA Asia Cup
Bronze medal – third place	2019 Bangalore	Team

Abby Bishop (born 29 November 1988) is an Australian former professional basketball player. She played in the Women's National Basketball League (WNBL) between 2005 and 2025 for the Australian Institute of Sport, Canberra Capitals, Dandenong Rangers, Adelaide Lightning, Townsville Fire and Southside Flyers. She played three seasons in the Women's National Basketball Association (WNBA), winning a WNBA championship in 2010 with the Seattle Storm. She was a member of the Australia women's national basketball team and won a bronze medal at the 2012 Summer Olympics.

== Personal life ==
Bishop was born on 29 November 1988 in Booleroo, South Australia. She is 189 centimetres (74 in) tall, and was featured in the Women's National Basketball League (WNBL)'s 2009 league calendar. In August 2013, Bishop took custody of her two-day-old niece, Zala Kate Bishop.

== Basketball ==
Bishop is a tall forward. In 2008, she was featured as a basketball star on myFiba.

=== Professional ===
==== WNBA ====
Bishop's rookie season in the WNBA was in 2010. In her first season in the WNBA playing for the Seattle Storm, she only played in 16 games, averaging 6.8 minutes per game. In these appearances, she averaged 2.8 points and 1.3 rebounds per game. Almost all her games and minutes came near the end of the season when the Storm head coach, Brian Agler rest the team's starters. While the Storm won their second WNBA championship in 2010, Bishop did not play in any post season games in her rookie year because she had a concussion during practice for the post season. She did not play with the Storm during the 2011 WNBA season as she wanted to focus on making the 2012 Australian Olympic squad. Bishop said: "I've decided to stay in Australia and focus on London. I know it's a year away, maybe over a year away now. But for me, it's about staying here and showing myself to the coaches where if I'm going back to America, it's going to be a little bit harder, not playing. So solely my focus is making that London team."

Bishop returned to the Storm for the 2015 WNBA season. She played a third season for the Storm in 2016.

==== WNBL ====
Bishop has averaged 13.8 points a game, 8.3 rebounds a game and 1.4 assists a game in her WNBL career. She had a scholarship with the Australian Institute of Sport and played for the AIS WNBL team in the 2005–06 WNBL season. She played for the Canberra Capitals in the 2006–07 season, and was with the team again for the 2007–08 season when she was nineteen-year-old. She stayed with the team for the 2008–09 season. In a January 2009 game against the AIS, she scored 20 points in the team's 87–51 victory, and in a late January 2009 game against the AIS which Canberra won 99–72, she scored 27 points. In a January 2009 game against the Logan Thunder that Canberra won 76–53, she scored 15 points. She played a fourth season for the Capitals in 2009–10.

Bishop played in the WNBL in 2010–11 for the Dandenong Rangers. She then played for the Adelaide Lightning in 2011–12. That season, she averaged 16.4 points a game, 8.2 rebounds a game and 2.6 assists a game. In an October 2011 game against the Australian Institute of Sport, she scored 21 points in a 97–47 win for Adelaide.

Bishop played for the Capitals between 2013 and 2016, where she won the WNBL Most Valuable Player Award in 2014–15. She returned to the Lightning for the 2017–18 season. In 2019–20, she played for the Townsville Fire. She played for the Southside Flyers in 2021–22 and 2022–23.

On 31 December 2024, Bishop announced her retirement after a 19-year career. On 10 January 2025, she came out of retirement and signed with the Canberra Capitals as a short-term injury replacement. She retired again on 15 February 2025.

==== Europe and Asia ====
Bishop played in France in 2012–13 with Perpignan Basket, then ended the 2013–14 season in Hungary with PEAC-Pecs, and ended the 2014–15 season also in Hungary with Aluinvent DVTK Miskolc. She spent the 2016–17 season in France with Tarbes Gespe Bigorre, and ended the 2017–18 season in Russia with WBC Dynamo Novosibirsk. She returned to Hungary for the 2018–19 season to play for KSC Szekszárd and then played in Italy for Virtus Bologna in 2020–21. After a season in Spain in 2023–24 with Hozono Global Jairis, Bishop had her final professional stint in the 2024 Women's Basketball League Asia with Chinese team Sichuan Yuanda Meile.

==== State leagues ====
Bishop played in the South East Australian Basketball League (SEABL) in 2011 for the Kilsyth Cobras. She took leave from Cobras duties during June while touring with the Australian Opals team in China. She returned to the SEABL in 2014 with the Launceston Tornadoes. She then played in the Queensland Basketball League (QBL) for the Rockhampton Cyclones in 2017, Sunshine Coast Phoenix in 2018, and split the 2019 QBL season with the Cyclones and Townsville Flames. She played for the Ipswich Force in the 2021 NBL1 North season and the Casey Cavaliers in the 2022 NBL1 South season.

=== National team ===
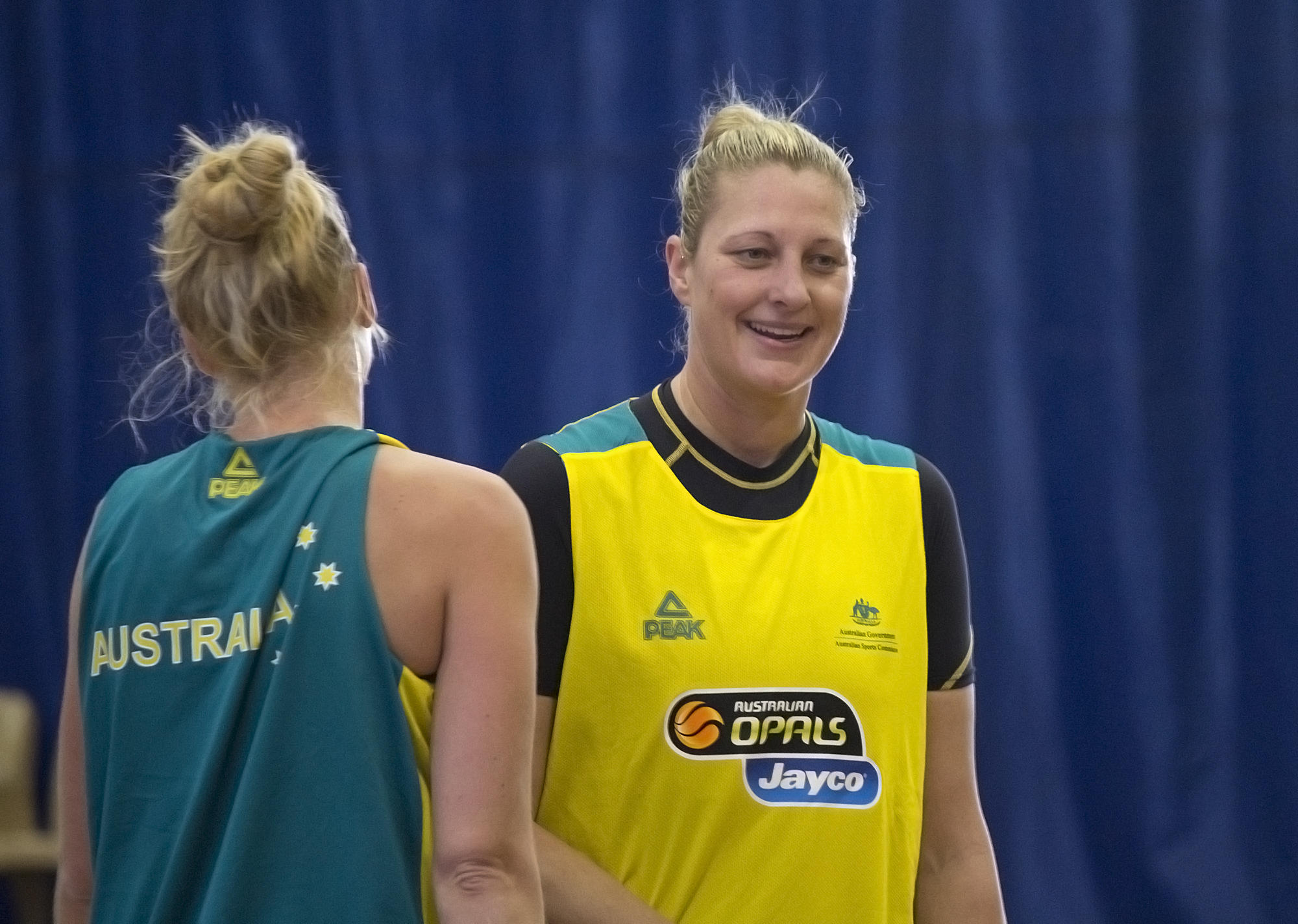
Suzy Batkovic and Abby Bishop (left) at day two of the Opals camp.

Bishop has represented Australia as a member of the Australian's age level teams. She was a member of the 2005 Australia Junior Women's Team that competed in the World Championships in Tunisia. As a member of the 2006 Junior Women's Team, she earned won a gold medal during the Oceania World Qualification Series and competed in the William Jones Cup in Taiwan. In 2007, she was a member of the Australia women's under-19 junior team that competed at the World Championships in the Slovak Republic. Her team finished fifth. She led the team in minutes played with 231 in 9 games. She made 39 of 83 attempted field goals, for a percentage of 47%. She made 35 out of 54 attempted free throws. She made 32 offensive rebounds, and 64 defensive rebounds. In 2007, she was a member of the Australian Young Women's Team that won a silver medal at the World Championships in Russia. She represented Australia at the 2011 Summer Universiade team in Shenzhen, China, where Australia took home a bronze medal. She was Australia's leading scorer in the tournament.

Bishop has represented Australia as a member of the Australian Opals. As a member of the 2007 team, she won a gold medal during the Oceania World Qualifications series. In 2008, she participated in the Good Luck Beijing 2008 held in China in the lead up to the Olympics. Her team was joined by national teams from United States, Cuba, Korea, New Zealand and China. Bishop was the youngest player on the team. In July 2010, she participated in a four-day training camp and one game test match against the United States in Connecticut. In 2010, she was a member of the senior women's national team that competed at the World Championships in the Czech Republic. In July 2011, she participated in the Olympic qualification competition. She played in the 2012 Summer Olympic qualifying game against the New Zealand women's national basketball team. In February 2012, she was named to a short list of 24 eligible players to represent Australia at the Olympics. In late April and early May 2012, she was one of four Australian "big" players to participate in a special training camp for the team. She participated in the national team training camp held from 14 to 18 May 2012 at the Australian Institute of Sport. At the 2012 Olympics, she was part of the Australian team that won the bronze medal.

== Career statistics ==
Legend
GP	Games played	GS	Games started	MPG	Minutes per game	RPG	Rebounds per game
APG	Assists per game	SPG	Steals per game	BPG	Blocks per game	PPG	Points per game
TO	Turnovers per game	FG%	Field-goal percentage	3P%	3-point field-goal percentage	FT%	Free-throw percentage
**Bold**	Career best	°	League leader

†	Denotes seasons in which Bishop won a WNBA championship

=== WNBA ===
==== Regular season ====
WNBA regular season statistics
Year	Team	GP	GS	MPG	FG%	3P%	FT%	RPG	APG	SPG	BPG	TO	PPG
2010^{†}	Seattle	16	0	6.8	.356	.250	.545	1.3	0.3	0.1	0.1	0.8	2.8
2011	Did not play (Olympics prioritization)												
2012	Did not play (Olympics prioritization)												
2013	Did not play (Personal decision)												
2014	Did not play (Personal decision)												
2015	Seattle	**26**	**14**	**19.6**	**.385**	**.329**	.615	**3.5**	**1.0**	**0.7**	**0.8**	1.1	**5.2**
2016	Seattle	13	0	5.2	.364	.167	**.750**	0.5	0.6	0.1	0.1	**0.1**	0.9
**Career**	3 years, 1 team	55	14	12.5	.377	.300	.607	2.1	0.7	0.4	0.4	0.7	3.5

==== Playoffs ====
WNBA playoff statistics
Year	Team	GP	GS	MPG	FG%	3P%	FT%	RPG	APG	SPG	BPG	TO	PPG
2010^{†}	Seattle	0	0	0.0	—	—	—	—	—	—	—	—	—
2016	Seattle	0	0	0.0	—	—	—	—	—	—	—	—	—
**Career**	2 years, 1 team	0	0	0.0	—	—	—	—	—	—	—	—	—

== See also ==
- List of Australian WNBA players
- WNBL Rookie of the Year Award
