= Kellie Abrams =

Australian basketball player

Personal information
- Born: 10 December 1978 (age 47)
- Listed height: 175 cm (5 ft 9 in)

Career information
- Playing career: 1995–2010
- Position: Guard

Career history
- 1995–1996: Australian Institute of Sport
- 1997–2010: Canberra Capitals

Career highlights
- 6× WNBL champion (2002, 2003, 2006, 2007, 2009, 2010)

Kellie Ann Abrams (born 10 December 1978) is an Australian former basketball player. She played 13 seasons for the Canberra Capitals in the Women's National Basketball League between 1997 and 2010.

Abrams debuted in the WNBL in 1995 with the Australian Institute of Sport. After two years with the AIS, she joined the Canberra Capitals in 1997. She won WNBL championships in 2002 and 2003. She retired in 2010 with six WNBL titles with the Capitals, three as captain.
