= Jessica Bibby =

Australian sportswoman (born 1979)

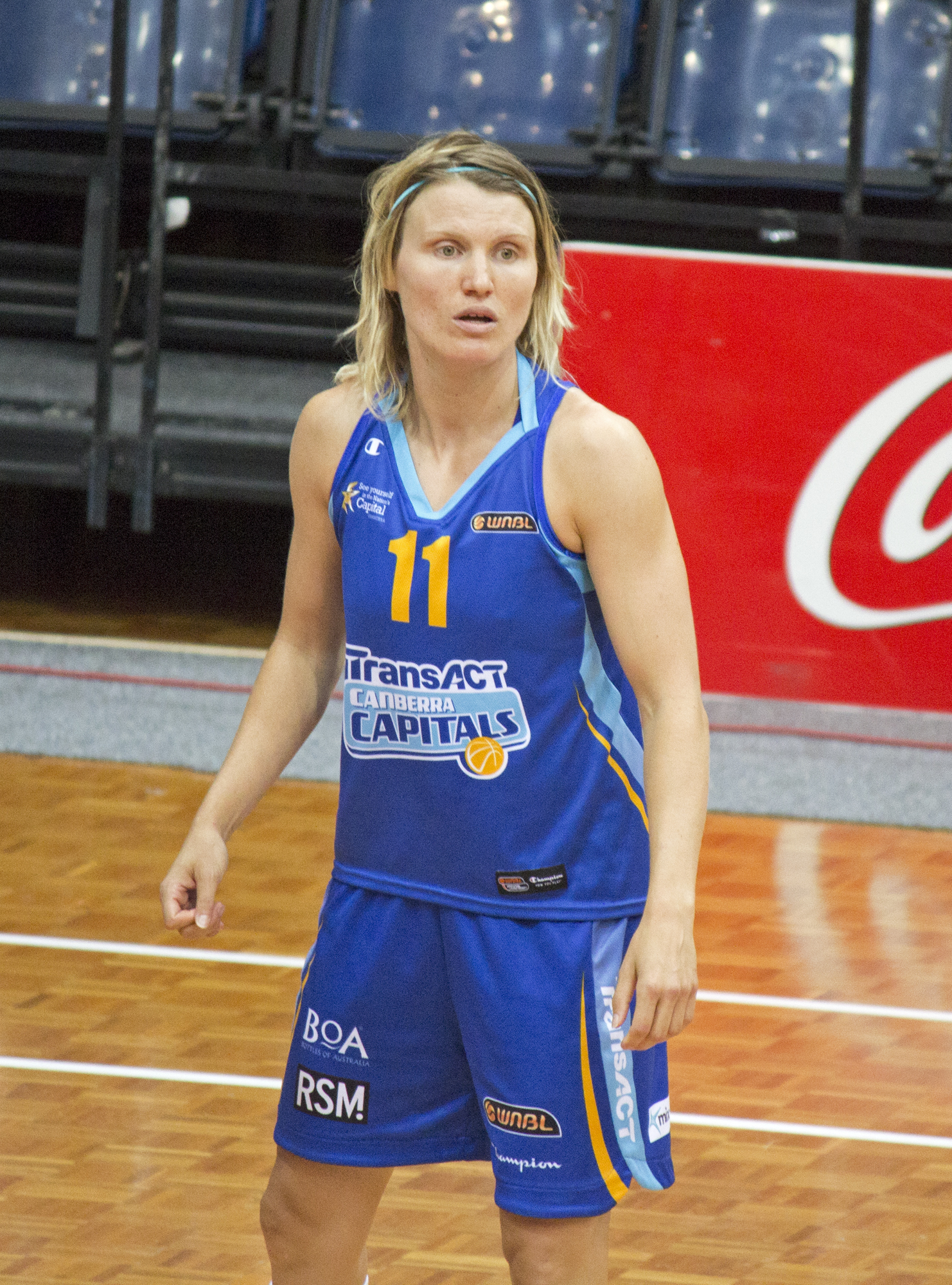
- Bibby during a game between the Capitals and Logan Thunder at AIS Arena
- Born: 23 August 1979 (age 47); Melbourne, Victoria, Australia
- Basketball career

Personal information
- Listed height: 1.69 m (5 ft 7 in)

Career information
- WNBA draft: 2000: 3rd round, 45th overall pick
- Drafted by: New York Liberty
- Playing career: 1995–2017
- Position: Guard

Career history
- 1996–2006: Dandenong Rangers
- 2000: New York Liberty
- 2006–2017: Canberra Capitals
- Stats at Basketball Reference
Medals
Representing Australia
Women's basketball
Junior World Championships
Silver medal – second place	1997 Junior World Championships	Women's basketball
JFIBA Oceania Championship
Gold medal – first place	2009 FIBA Oceania Championship	Women's basketball
Australian rules football career
Personal information
- Debut: Round 1, 2017, Greater Western Sydney vs. Adelaide, at Thebarton Oval
- Height: 169 cm (5 ft 7 in)
- Position: Defender
Playing career^{1}
Years	Club	Games (Goals)
2017	Greater Western Sydney	7 (0)
- ^{1} Playing statistics correct to the end of 2017.

Bibby on the floor during the Canberra Capitals v Townsville Fire 2011/12 home opener. Bibby is in blue, wearing long white socks.

Jessica Bibby (born 23 August 1979) is an Australian sportswoman. She has played nearly 400 games in the WNBL and won several WNBL Championships. She has played for the Dandenong Rangers and Canberra Capitals. She was drafted by the WNBA's New York Liberty in 2000 and played for the team. She has played for the Australian national basketball team at junior and senior level.

In 2017, turned to Australian rules football, playing for Greater Western Sydney in all seven games of the 2017 AFL Women's season. Bibby retired from professional sport at the end of the season.

== Personal ==
Bibby was born on 23 August 1979. She is 169 centimetres (67 in) tall. In 1999, she seriously injured her back, and it was possible that she might never play basketball again, but surgery allowed her to return to the sport.

== Basketball ==
Bibby is a guard.

=== Junior ===
As a junior basketball player, she played for the Kilsyth Cobras in Victoria.

=== Queensland Basketball League ===
In 2011, Bibby was a member of the QBL's Gladstone Port City Power that won their third championship in three years. In a game that season, she came first in the scoring with 50 points, 8 points ahead of the second highest scorer and Capitals teammate Rebecca Haynes who scored 42.

=== WNBL ===
Bibby started playing in the WNBL in 1996. In her debut season with the league, she was named the WNBL's Betty Watson Rookie of the Year. She has won several championships in the WNBL. In January 2008, she played her 200th game in the league.

==== Dandenong Rangers ====
Bibby joined the Rangers in 1996 and was a member of the team until 2006. In her first season with the team, she averaged 4.5 points per game. Her highest season average points per game for the Rangers was 14.9 during the 1999/2000 season. In her final season with the team, she played only 6 games after having played 21 games during all seasons from 1998/1999 to 2004/2005. Bibby has been part of the Rangers teams that won WNBL Championships during the 2003/2004 season, and during the 2004/2005 season.

==== Canberra Capitals ====
Bibby joined the Capitals for the 2006/2007 season. In her first season with the team, she averaged 15.5 points per game during the regular season. In an October 2006 game, as part of a 5-game winning streak, she scored 20 points in a single game. In a December 2006 game against Sydney, she scored 15 points. In her second season, she averaged 16.1 points per game and 15.1 points per game in her third season with the team. In a December 2007 game, she scored 22 points in a game against Bulleen. During the 2009/2010 season, she averaged 14.5 points per game. In an October 2009 game, she scored 22 points in a game against the Adelaide Lightning. In a January 2010 game, she made an important two-point shot near the end of the game that helped her team win a game against the Bulleen Boomers. She took a week off from the team in February 2010 following the death of her brother. She became the captain of the Capitals at the start of the 2010/2011 season, taking over the position vacated by Kellie Abrams.

Bibby has been part Capitals teams that won WNBL Championships during the 2006/2007 season, 2008/2009 season, and during the 2009/2010 season. In the 2006/2007 finals game, she scored 11 points while not being one of the team's starting five players.

=== WNBA ===
Bibby was drafted during the third round of the 2000 draft. She was selected 45th overall. Bibby played her first game in the WNBA in 2000 for the New York Liberty. She played while dealing with severe back pain. Her number with the team was 11.

=== National team ===
Bibby had 58 caps for the junior national team. As part of the 1997 team, she helped the Australian side capture a silver medal at the Junior World Championships.

Bibby has made several caps for the senior national team. She made her debut for the team in 2009, during a test match in China. She was part of the national team that won a gold medal at the 2009 FIBA Oceania Championship. In the finals, she scored 19 points. She was part of the Opals side that competed in the 2012 Summer Olympics qualifying tournament.

== See also ==
- List of Australian WNBA players
- WNBL Rookie of the Year Award
