= Michelle Cosier =

Australian basketball player

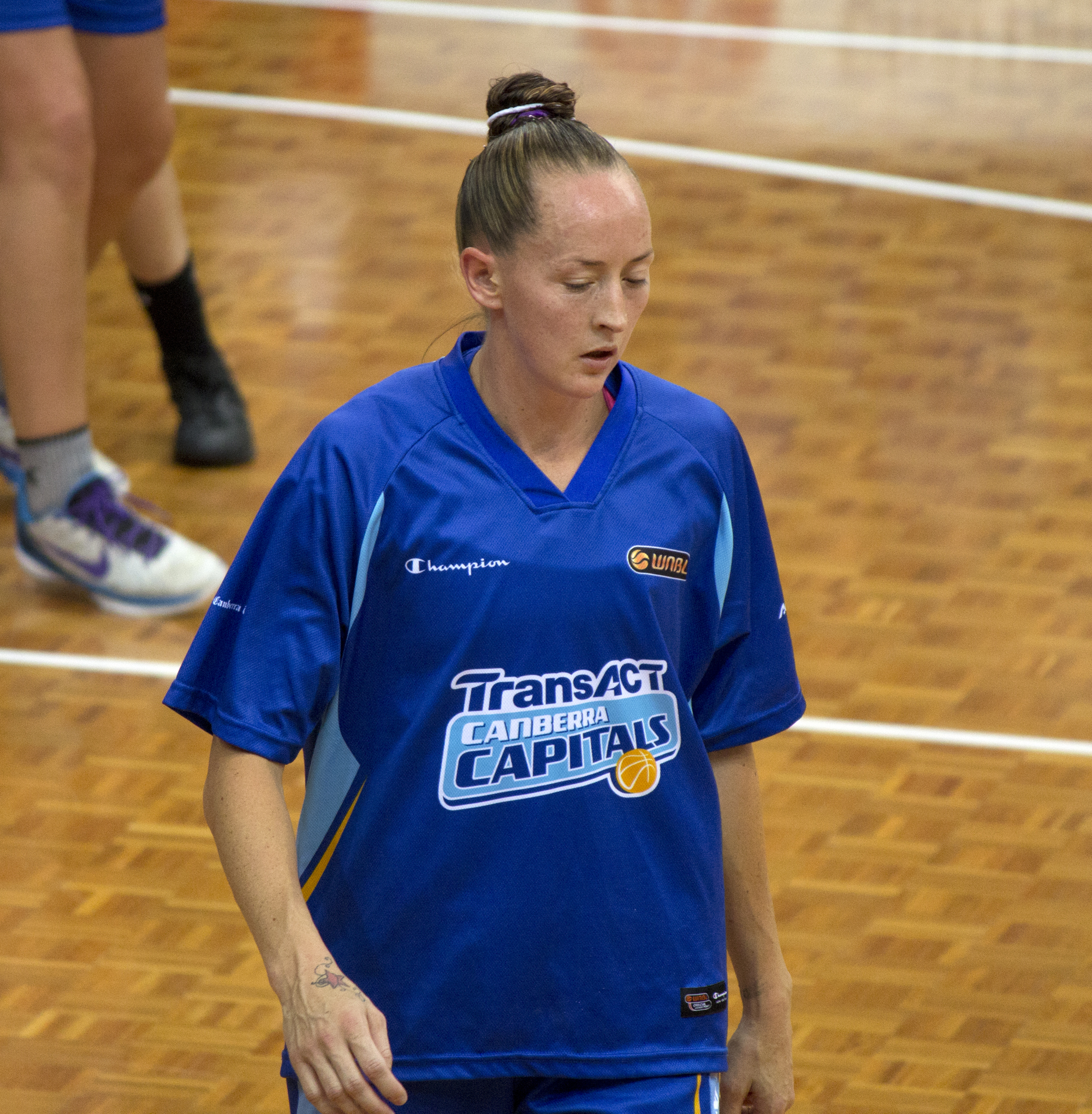
- Cosier during a game between the Capitals and Logan Thunder at AIS Arena

No. 30 – Canberra Capitals
- Position: Guard
- League: WNBL

Personal information
- Born: 30 April 1982 (age 44) Bairnsdale, Victoria
- Listed height: 1.78 m (5 ft 10 in)

Michelle Cosier (née Musselwhite) (born 30 April 1982) is an Australian basketball player who has played for the Canberra Capitals in the WNBL.

== Personal ==
Cosier was born in Bairnsdale, Victoria on 30 April 1982. She is 178 centimetres (70 in) tall. She is married and her maiden name was Musselwhite. She has a son who was born in the last week of February 2010. He was Cosier and her husband's first child. She has two brothers and a sister. When not playing basketball, Cosier works with indigenous children, promoting healthy living.

== Juniors ==
Cosier played junior basketball with Victoria's Bairnsdale Bullets.

== WNBL ==
Cosier has played for three clubs in Australia's WNBL.

=== Dandenong Rangers ===
Cosier played for the Dandenong Rangers during the 2000/2001, 2001/2002 and 2002/2003 seasons. In the first two years, she played in one play off game each season for the team.

=== Sydney Uni Flames ===
Cosier played for the Sydney Uni Flames from 2003 to 2008. Her 2005/2006 season was cut short after an injury and she only played in 10 games that season.

=== Canberra Capitals ===
Cosier wears number 30 for the Capitals, where she plays guard. Her nickname on the team is Muss. She did not play for the Capitals during the 2009/2010 season because she was pregnant.

==== 2010/2011 ====
In 2010/2011, Cosier was on the roster and played for the Canberra Capitals. She was one of the reasons the Capitals beat Townsville in Townsville for the first time in two years. In a January 2011 article, the Canberra Times described her as being a threat to shoot on the perimeter. In a January 2011 game against the West Coast Waves, she scored 12 points. Her stats at the end of the season were an average of 11.5 points and six rebounds a game. She played appeared in the finals. She was one of the team's two leading scorers during the team's 103–78 loss to the Bulleen Boomers. She scored 21 points and had 9 rebounds in the game. Her stats at the end of the season were an average of 11.5 points and six rebounds a game. At the end of the season, she was one of only two players from the 2010/2011 squad signed to play for the team in 2011/2012.

==== 2011/2012 ====
Cosier participated in the team's first training session for the season on 13 September 2011 at the Belconnen Basketball Centre. In October 2011, Cosier was not getting time on the court because she was suffering an injury. On 21 September 2011, she was diagnosed with osteitis pubis. By 6 January 2012, her four previous game stats averaged 6.3 points, 7.3 rebounds, eight assists per game. In December 2011, she was still injured and could not play in a game against the West Coast Waves that Canberra won, and in the December 2011 game they lost to the Adelaide Lightning.

== Waratah Basketball League ==
In 2010, she played for the Canberra Nationals in the Waratah Basketball League. In the Grand Finals loss versus Bankstown Bruins, she scored 7 points.

== National team ==
Cosier has played for the young and senior national teams, 34 and 17 caps respective for each. As a member of the young national team, she participated in the 2003 Young World Championships, where the team came in fifth. She did NOT represent Australia on an international level.
